= 2022–23 Úrvalsdeild karla (basketball) =

Subway deild karla^{1}
- Duration: 6 October 2022 – 18 May 2023
- Teams: 12
- TV partner: Stöð 2 Sport

Regular season
- League champions: Valur
- Relegated: KR, ÍR

Finals
- Champions: Tindastóll
- Runners-up: Valur
- Semi-finalists: Þór Þorlákshöfn, Njarðvík
- Finals MVP: (United States) Keyshawn Woods

Awards
- Domestic MVP: (Iceland) Kári Jónsson
- Foreign MVP: (United States) Vincent Malik Shahid

Statistical leaders
Points	(United States) Robert Turner	29.0
Rebounds	(United States) Taylor Maurice Johns	13.9
Assists	(United States) Vincent Malik Shahid	9.1
- All statistics correct as of 19 May 2023.^{1} Sponsored league name, referring to Úrvalsdeild karla.

The 2022–23 Úrvalsdeild karla was the 72nd season of the Úrvalsdeild karla, the top tier men's basketball league in Iceland. The season started on 6 October 2022 and ended on 18 May 2023. Tindastóll won its third title, and its first in 39 years, by defeating Valur 3–2 in the Finals.

== Competition format ==
The participating teams first played a conventional round-robin schedule with every team playing each opponent once home and once away for a total of 22 games. The top eight teams qualified for the championship playoffs whilst the two last qualified were relegated to 1. deild karla.

== Teams ==
Team	City, Region	Arena	Head coach
Breiðablik	Kópavogur	Smárinn	(Iceland) Pétur Ingvarsson
Grindavík	Grindavík	Mustad Höllin	(Iceland) Jóhann Þór Ólafsson
Haukar	Hafnarfjörður	Höllin	(Iceland) Máté Dalmay
Höttur	Egilsstaðir	MVA-höllin	(Iceland) Viðar Örn Hafsteinsson
ÍR	Reykjavík	Hertz Hellirinn	(Iceland) Ísak Máni Wíum
Keflavík	Keflavík	TM Höllin	(Iceland) Hjalti Þór Vilhjálmsson
KR	Reykjavík	DHL Höllin	(Iceland) Helgi Már Magnússon
Njarðvík	Njarðvík	Ljónagryfjan	(Iceland) Benedikt Guðmundsson
Stjarnan	Garðabær	Ásgarður	(Iceland) Arnar Guðjónsson
Tindastóll	Sauðárkrókur	Síkið	(Iceland) Pavel Ermolinskij
Valur	Reykjavík	Origo-höllin	(Iceland) Finnur Freyr Stefánsson
Þór Þorlákshöfn	Þorlákshöfn	Icelandic Glacial Höllin	(Iceland) Lárus Jónsson

=== Managerial changes ===
Team	Outgoing manager	Manner of departure	Date of vacancy	Position in table	Replaced with	Date of appointment
ÍR	(Iceland) Friðrik Ingi Rúnarsson	End of contract	1 April 2022	Off-season	(Iceland) Ísak Máni Wíum	5 April 2022
Grindavík	(Iceland) Sverrir Þór Sverrisson	End of contract	2 June 2022	Off-season	(Iceland) Jóhann Þór Ólafsson	2 June 2022
Tindastóll	(Iceland) Baldur Þór Ragnarsson	End of contract	12 July 2022	Off-season	(Croatia) Vladimir Anzulović	27 July 2022
Tindastóll	(Croatia) Vladimir Anzulović	Fired	8 January 2023	7th	(Iceland) Pavel Ermolinskij	14 January 2023

== Playoffs ==
=== Bracket ===
Quarterfinals
1	Valur	3
8	Stjarnan	1
2	Njarðvík	3
7	Grindavík	0
(Pairings are reseeded after the first round)
3	Haukar	2
7	Þór Þorlákshöfn	3
4	Keflavík	1
5	Tindastóll	3

Semifinals
1	Valur	3
6	Þór Þorlákshöfn	2
2	Njarðvík	1
5	Tindastóll	3

Finals
3	Valur	2
5	Tindastóll	3

=== Finals ===
Team 1	Series	Team 2	Game 1	Game 2	Game 3	Game 4	Game 5
Valur	2–3	Tindastóll	82–83	100–87	79–90	82–69	81–82

== Notable incidents ==
- On 30 April, Dominykas Milka confirmed that Keflavík would not be offering him a contract after three seasons and one trip to the Úrvalsdeild finals.
- On 2 May, Dagur Kár Jónsson returned to the Úrvalsdeild after playing in Spain and signed with KR.
- On 10 May, Höttur signed Montenegrin center Nemanja Knezevic who had played the previous five seasons with Vestri and led the Úrvalsdeild in rebounding during the 2021–22 season.
- On 12 May, Haukar signed Hilmar Smári Henningsson from Stjarnan and Breki Gylfason from ÍR, both of whom came up through Haukar's junior programs.
- On 21 May, it was reported that Ágúst Orrason, who had played the previous seven seasons with Keflavík was retiring from top-level basketball.
- On 21 May, Haukar signed Daniel Mortensen, the reigning Úrvalsdeild Foreign Player of the Year, who played the previous season with Þór Þorlákshöfn.
- On 6 June, Þór Þorlákshöfn signed Fotios Lampropoulos who helped Njarðvík to the best record in the league the previous season.
- On 10 June, the 2021 Úrvalsdeild Playoffs MVP, Adomas Drungilas, signed with Tindastóll after playing for Tartu Ülikool in the Latvian-Estonian Basketball League the previous season.
- On 17 July, Höttur signed American-Hungarian point guard Obie Trotter.
- On 25 July, Breiðablik signed 1. deild karla assists leader Clayton Ladine from Hrunamenn.
- On 3 August, Haukar signed Lithuanian forward Norbertas Giga.
- On 16 August, Njarðvík signed former Iran national team player Philip Jalalpoor.
- On 16 August, Grindavík signed former Greek Basket League champion Gaios Skordilis.
- On 27 August, Brynjar Þór Björnsson announced his retirement from top-tier basketball.
- On 5 October, Pavel Ermolinskij announced his retirement from playing.
- On 13 October, Njarðvík released former Iran national team player Philip Jalalpoor after appearing in one game for the club.
- On 14 October, Valur signed back Callum Lawson who had initially signed with JA Vichy after winning the national title with Valur in 2022.
- On 14 October, Styrmir Snær Þrastarson joined Þór Þorlákshöfn after starting the season with Davidson College.
- On 18 October, KR signed Philip Jalalpoor who started the season with Njarðvík.
- On 19 October, Njarðvík announced that it had signed Nicolás Richotti to fill the spot left by the release of Philip Jalalpoor. Richotti spent the 2021–22 season with Njarðvík, where he averaged 14.4 points, 4.4 rebounds and 5.2 assists.
- On 19 October, Grindavík announced it had signed Icelandic national team member Jón Axel Guðmundsson.
- On 21 October, KR signed E. C. Matthews to replace Michael Mallory.
- On 1 November, it was reported that Vangelis Tzolos had left Grindavík after appearing in four games where he averaged 8.3 points and 2.3 rebounds.
- On 15 November, Njarðvík announced it had signed former Spanish national team member Nacho Martín.
- On 17 November, Grindavík signed former Úrvalsdeild scoring leader Damier Pitts.
- On 21 November, Þór Þorlákshöfn's Vincent Malik Shahid set a new Úrvalsdeild single game assist record when he handed out 19 assists in a victory against Keflavík, breaking David Edwards record of 18 assists set on 8 December 1996.
- On 14 December, KR signed Ireland national team member Brian Fitzpatrick.
- On 15 December, KR released Roberts Freimanis after he averaged 8.6 points, 6.3 rebounds and 1.6 assists in nine games.
- On 29 December, Logi Gunnarsson became the oldest player to score 20 points in an Úrvalsdeild karla game when he scored 23 points for Njarðvík in a victory against Keflavík, breaking Alexander Ermolinskij's record from 2001.
- On 30 December, Stjarnan announced that Julius Jucikas and Robert Turner, the league's second leading scorer, where leaving the team. Jucikas was released by the club but Turner was bought by
- On 2 January, it was reported that KR had released Jordan Semple and would release E. C. Matthews following its game against Grindavík on 5 January. The same day it was announced the team had signed Justas Tamulis.
- On 5 January, KR announced it had reached an agreement with Dagur Kár Jónsson to release him from his contract so he could sign with Stjarnan.
- On 6 January, KR signed Antonio Williams, their 10th foreign player of the season.
- On 24 January, Zoran Vrkić was released by the Tindastóll after averaging 7.7 points and 4.1 rebounds. Three days later, he signed with rival Úrvalsdeild club Grindavík.
- On 26 January, Höttur signed former Dutch national team member Bryan Alberts. He had previously played for Höttur in 2021.
- On 9 March, KR was officially relegated to the second-tier 1. deild karla for the first time in its history.
- On 15 April, following Keflavík first round playoffs loss against Tindastóll, Hjalti Þór Vilhjálmsson announced that he would not return as Keflavík's head coach.
- On 29 April, following Njarðvík semi-finals loss against Tindastóll, Logi Gunnarsson retired from playing basketball.
- On 18 May, Tindastóll's long time captain, Helgi Rafn Viggósson, announced his retirement from basketball following Tindastóll's victory against Valur in the Úrvalsdeild finals.
- On 1 June, Valur's guard Pablo Bertone was suspended for five games for entering the referee room to complain following Valur's loss to Tindastóll in the fifth and deciding game of the Úrvalsdeild finals on 18 May.

== Clubs in European competitions ==
Team	Competition	Progress
Þór Þorlákshöfn	FIBA Europe Cup	First qualifying round
