= 2023–24 Úrvalsdeild karla (basketball) =

Subway deild karla^{1}
- Duration: October 2023 – 29 May 2024
- Teams: 12
- TV partner: Stöð 2 Sport

Regular season
- Top seed: Valur
- Relegated: Breiðablik, Hamar

Finals
- Champions: Valur
- Runners-up: Grindavík
- Semi-finalists: Keflavík, Njarðvík

Statistical leaders
Points	(United States) Remy Martin	25.8
Rebounds	(United States) Kevin Kone	11.5
Assists	(United States) Chaz Williams	8.4
- All statistics correct as of 31 May 2024.^{1} Sponsored league name, referring to Úrvalsdeild karla.

The 2023–24 Úrvalsdeild karla is the 73rd season of the Úrvalsdeild karla, the top tier men's basketball league in Iceland.

== Competition format ==
The participating teams first played a conventional round-robin schedule with every team playing each opponent once home and once away for a total of 22 games. The top eight teams qualified for the championship playoffs whilst the two last qualified were relegated to 1. deild karla.

== Teams ==
Team	City, Region	Arena	Head coach
Álftanes	Álftanes	Forsetahöllin	(Iceland) Kjartan Atli Kjartansson
Breiðablik	Kópavogur	Smárinn	(Iceland) Ívar Ásgrímsson
Grindavík	Grindavík	Mustad Höllin	(Iceland) Jóhann Þór Ólafsson
Hamar	Hveragerði	Frystikistan	(Iceland) Halldór Karl Þórsson
Haukar	Hafnarfjörður	Höllin	(Iceland) Máté Dalmay
Höttur	Egilsstaðir	MVA-höllin	(Iceland) Viðar Örn Hafsteinsson
Keflavík	Keflavík	TM Höllin	(Iceland) Pétur Ingvarsson
Njarðvík	Njarðvík	Ljónagryfjan	(Iceland) Benedikt Guðmundsson
Stjarnan	Garðabær	Ásgarður	(Iceland) Arnar Guðjónsson
Tindastóll	Sauðárkrókur	Síkið	(Iceland) Pavel Ermolinskij
Valur	Reykjavík	Origo-höllin	(Iceland) Finnur Freyr Stefánsson
Þór Þorlákshöfn	Þorlákshöfn	Icelandic Glacial Höllin	(Iceland) Lárus Jónsson

=== Managerial changes ===
Team	Outgoing manager	Manner of departure	Date of vacancy	Position in table	Replaced with	Date of appointment
Keflavík	(Iceland) Hjalti Þór Vilhjálmsson	End of contract	15 April 2023	Off-season	(Iceland) Pétur Ingvarsson	1 June 2023
Breiðablik	(Iceland) Pétur Ingvarsson	End of contract	25 April 2023	Off-season	(Iceland) Ívar Ásgrímsson	25 April 2023

== Notable incidents ==
- On 5 May, Grindavík signed Daniel Mortensen.
- On 5 May, Grindavík signed American DeAndre Kane.
- On 17 May, Álftanes signed former Keflavík point guard Hörður Axel Vilhjálmsson.
- On 17 May, Grindavík signed former Njarðvík point guard Dedrick Basile.
- On 18 May, Grindavík signed former Keflavík point guard Valur Orri Valsson.
- On 18 May, it was reported that Grindavík guard Bragi Guðmundsson had signed with Penn State University.
- On 24 May, Álftanes signed Icelandic national team player Haukur Helgi Pálsson who had spent the previous two seasons with Njarðvík.
- On 12 June, David Okeke left Keflavík after two seasons and signed with Haukar.
- On 15 June, Ægir Steinarsson signed with Stjarnan after playing the previous two seasons in Spain.
- On 23 June, Álftanes signed former South Dakota State star Douglas Wilson.
- On 28 June, Haukar signed Finnish forward Osku Heinonen.
- On 12 July, Dominykas Milka signed with Njarðvík after playing the previous four seasons with their cross-town rivals Keflavík.
- On 12 July, Tindastóll signed Iceland national team player Þórir Þorbjarnarson.
- On 23 July, Haukar signed former NCAA Division I assist leader Jalen Moore.
- On 25 July, Nicolás Richotti, who had played the previous two seasons with Njarðvík, announced his retirement from basketball.
- On 15 August, Callum Lawson signed with Tindastóll.
- On 24 August, Valur signed Kristinn Pálsson.
- On 26 October, Stjarnan signed four time Liga Portuguesa de Basquetebol champion James Ellisor.
- On 26 October, Breiðablik announced it had signed 36-year old Zoran Vrkić who played the previous season with Tindastóll and Grindavík.
- On 14 November, it was reported that Haukar had released Jalen Moore, who was leading the league in scoring with 27.3 points in six games.
- On 16 November, Hamar signed Jalen Moore and released Maurice Creek and Jose Medina
- In November, Grindavík's homecourt was seriously damaged in a series of earthquakes that led to the total evacuation of the town of Grindavík due to the threat of a volcanic eruption in the area.
- On 15 December, Danero Thomas announced his retirement from playing. He appeared in 11 games for Hamar during the season, where he averaged 10.8 points and 6.2 rebounds per game. However, in January 2024 he signed with Keflavík after being convinced by Keflavík's coach Pétur Ingvarsson to come out of retirement.
- On 18 December, Taiwo Badmus signed with Valur. He started the season with Luiss Roma but spent the previous two seasons with Tindastóll and which faced Valur in the 2022 and 2023 finals.
- On 19 December, it was reported that Damier Pitts had left Haukar after appearing in four league games where he averaged 14.8 points.
- On 16 January, Everage Richardson left Breiðablik and signed with Haukar.

== Clubs in European competitions ==
Team	Competition	Progress
Tindastóll	FIBA Europe Cup	First qualifying round
