= Logi Gunnarsson =

Icelandic basketball player (born 1981)

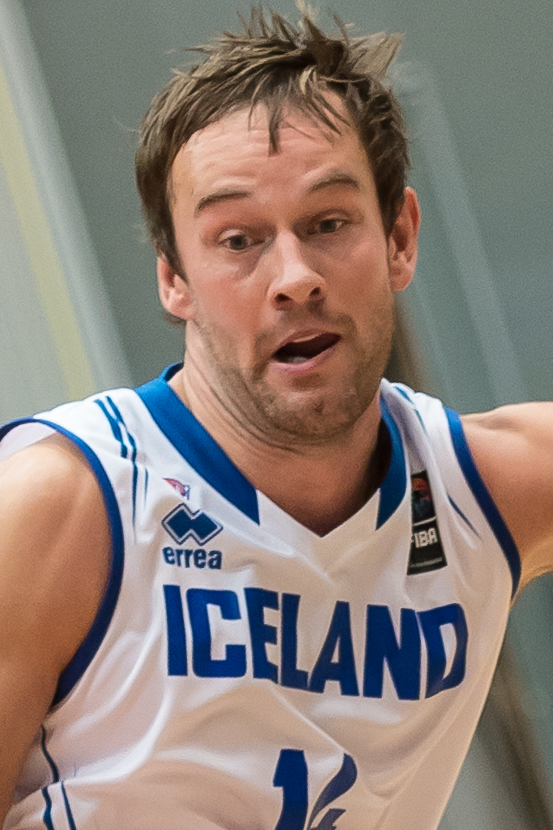

Njarðvík
- Title: Assistant coach
- League: Úrvalsdeild karla

Personal information
- Born: 5 September 1981 (age 45) Keflavík, Iceland
- Listed height: 1.92 m (6 ft 4 in)

Career information
- High school: St. Mary (Rutherford, New Jersey)
- Playing career: 1997–2023
- Position: Shooting guard
- Number: 14

Career history

Playing
- 1997–1998: Njarðvík
- 2000–2002: Njarðvík
- 2002–2003: ratiopharm Ulm
- 2003–2005: Gießen 46ers
- 2005–2006: BBC Bayreuth
- 2006–2007: Torpan Pojat
- 2007–2008: Gijón Baloncesto
- 2008–2009: Njarðvík
- 2009–2010: Saint-Étienne Basket
- 2010–2012: Solna Vikings
- 2012–2013: Angers BC 49
- 2013–2023: Njarðvík

Coaching
- 2024–present: Njarðvík (assistant)

Career highlights
- Icelandic Male Basketball Player of the Year (2001); 3× Úrvalsdeild Domestic All-First Team (2001, 2015, 2017); 3× Icelandic Champion (1998, 2001, 2002); 2× Icelandic Cup (2002, 2021); Icelandic Company Cup (2001)

Career Úrvalsdeild karla statistics
- Points: 3,997 (13.7 ppg)
- Assists: 711 (2.4 apg)
- Games: 291
Medals
Men's basketball
Representing Iceland
Games of the Small States of Europe
Silver medal – second place	2001 San Marino	Team
Silver medal – second place	2003 Andorra	Team
Gold medal – first place	2007 Monaco	Team
Silver medal – second place	2015 Reykjavík	Team

Logi Gunnarsson (born 5 September 1981) is an Icelandic former basketball player who played most of his career for Njarðvík in the Icelandic top-tier Úrvalsdeild karla. He was a member of the Icelandic national basketball team, where he participated at the EuroBasket 2015 and EuroBasket 2017. During his career he has won the Icelandic championship three times, in 1998, 2001 and 2002, and the Icelandic Cup twice, in 2002 and 2021. In 2001, he was named the Icelandic Male Basketball Player of the Year.

== Playing career ==
=== Club career ===
Logi came up through the junior programs of Njarðvík and played his first games with the senior team during the 1997–1998 season. He scored a season high 20 points against KFÍ on 8 March 1998. He played limited minutes in Njarðvík's playoffs run which ended with a three-game sweep of KR in the finals.

The following season Logi moved to the United States where he played high school basketball for St. Mary High School in Rutherford, New Jersey. He returned to Iceland and joined Njarðvík again in February 2000. He went on to average 9.5 points and scored a season high 25 points against Körfuknattleiksfélag ÍA on 3 March 2000. During the playoffs, he averaged 11.3 points but was unable to stop Njarðvík from losing against eventual champions KR in the semi-finals.

In 2001 Njarðvík beat Tindastóll 3–1 in the Icelandic finals. Logi averaged 20,7 ppg in the regular season at the age of 19.

He recorded game high twice in the finals, 36 points in game 2 and 32 points the final game 4.

In 2002 they repeated and won the championship again beating their rivals Keflavík 3–0 in the finals. Logi averaged 17,5 ppg in the regular season.

Before the 2002–2003 season Logi signed for Ratiopharm ULM in Germany.

2003-2005 he played for Giessen 46ers in the German bundisliga.

In 2005 Logi signed for Bayreuth in Germany.

In the next seasons he played in Finland, Spain, Sweden and France before returning to Iceland in 2013, signing for his home team Njarðvík where he finished his career.

He only played for one club in is career in Iceland.

On 5 January 2020, he appeared in an Úrvalsdeild game for the fourth different decade. During the 2020–2021 season, the 25th of his career, Logi averaged 11.5 points per game.

On 18 September 2021 he scored 14 points in Njarðvík's 97–93 win against Stjarnan in the Icelandic Cup final, ending the clubs 16 year major title draught. On 2 October 2021, he had scored 2 points in Njarðvík's 100–113 loss against Þór Þorlákshöfn in the Icelandic Super Cup. In October, he suffered a knee injury after a collision with a teammate during a game between Njarðvík and Valur and was expected to miss six weeks.

In August 2022, he signed a 2-year contract extension with Njarðvík. On 29 December 2022, he became the oldest player to score 20 points in an Úrvalsdeild karla game when he had 23 points in a victory against Keflavík, breaking Alexander Ermolinskij's record from 2001.

He announced his retirement from basketball following the 2022–2023 season.

=== National team career ===
On 25 July 2011 Logi scored his one-thousandth point for the national team. He participated with Iceland at the EuroBasket 2015 and EuroBasket 2017. He has also participated five–times at the Games of the Small States of Europe.

On 19 February 2018 Logi announced that he would retire from national team play after Iceland's games against Finland and the Czech Republic in the 2019 FIBA Basketball World Cup qualification later that month. From 2000 to 2018 he played 147 games for the national team.

== Coaching career ==
In July 2024, Logi was hired as an assistant to Njarðvík's Rúnar Inga Erlingsson.

== Personal life ==
Logi is the son of former Icelandic national team player Gunnar Þorvarðarson.
