= Úrvalsdeild Men's Coach of the Year =

The Men's Coach of the Year is an award for the top-tier basketball league in Iceland, the men's Úrvalsdeild.

== All-time award winners ==
The following is a list of the all-time Úrvalsdeild Men's Coach of the Year winners.

Season	Player	Team
1987–1988	(Iceland) Pálmar Sigurðsson	Haukar
1988–1989	(Hungary) László Németh	KR
1989–1990	(Hungary) László Németh (2x)	KR
1990–1991	(Iceland) Friðrik Ingi Rúnarsson	Njarðvík
1991–1992	(Iceland) Friðrik Ingi Rúnarsson (2x)	Njarðvík
1992–1993	(Iceland) Ingvar S. Jónsson	Haukar
1993–1994	(Iceland) Guðmundur Bragason	Grindavík
1994–1995	(Iceland) Tómas Holton	Skallagrímur
1995–1996	(Iceland) Birgir Guðbjörnsson	Breiðablik
1996–1997	(Ukraine) Alexander Ermolinskij	ÍA
1997–1998	(Iceland) Jón Sigurðsson	KR
1998–1999	(Iceland) Friðrik Ingi Rúnarsson (3x)	Njarðvík
1999–2000	(Iceland) Valur Ingimundarson	Tindastóll
2000–2001	(Iceland) Pétur Ingvarsson	Hamar
2001–2002	(Iceland) Eggert Maríuson	Breiðablik
2002–2003	(Iceland) Reynir Kristjánsson	Haukar
2003–2004	(Iceland) Bárður Eyþórsson	Snæfell
2004–2005	(Iceland) Benedikt Guðmundsson	Fjölnir
2005–2006	(Iceland) Bárður Eyþórsson (2x)	Snæfell
2006–2007	(Iceland) Einar Árni Jóhannsson	Njarðvík
2007–2008	(Iceland) Sigurður Ingimundarson	Keflavík
2008–2009	(Iceland) Benedikt Guðmundsson (2x)	KR
2009–2010	(Iceland) Ingi Þór Steinþórsson	Snæfell
2010–2011	(Iceland) Hrafn Kristjánsson	KR
2011–2012	(Iceland) Helgi Jónas Guðfinnsson	Grindavík
2012–2013	(Iceland) Sverrir Þór Sverrisson	Grindavík
2013–2014	(Iceland) Finnur Freyr Stefánsson	KR
2014–2015	(Spain) Israel Martín	Tindastóll
2015–2016	(Iceland) Finnur Freyr Stefánsson (2x)	KR
2016–2017	(Iceland) Jóhann Þór Ólafsson	Grindavík
2017–2018	(Iceland) Finnur Freyr Stefánsson (3x)	KR
2018–2019	(North Macedonia) Borce Ilievski	ÍR
2020–2021	(Iceland) Lárus Jónsson	Þór Þorlákshöfn
2021–2022	(Iceland) Baldur Þór Ragnarsson	Tindastóll
2022–2023	(Iceland) Jóhann Þór Ólafsson (2x)	Grindavík
2023–2024	(Iceland) Benedikt Guðmundsson (3x)	Njarðvík
2024–2025	(Iceland) Rúnar Ingi Erlingsson	Njarðvík
