= Sverrir Þór Sverrisson =

Icelandic basketball player and coach

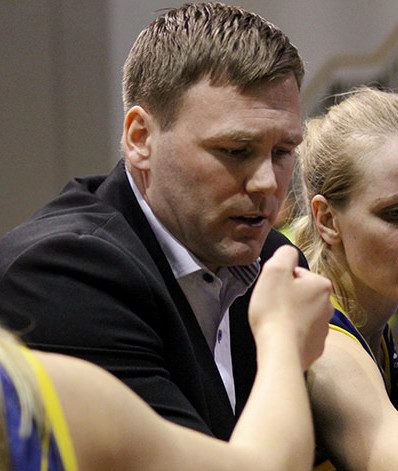
- Sverrir during the 2015 Women's Cup finals.

Personal information
- Born: 23 May 1975 (age 51) Reykjanesbær, Iceland
- Listed height: 187 cm (6 ft 2 in)

Career information
- Playing career: 1994–2016
- Number: 8
- Coaching career: 2004–2024

Career history

Playing
- 1993–1994: Snæfell
- 1994–1995: Keflavík
- 1995–1997: Njarðvík
- 1997–2000: Tindastóll
- 2001–2007: Keflavík
- 2007–2008: Njarðvík
- 2008–2010: Keflavík
- 2010–2012: Njarðvík-b
- 2012–2014: Keflavík-b
- 2014–2016: Njarðvík-b

Coaching
- 2004–2006: Keflavík (Women's)
- 2010–2012: Njarðvík (Women's)
- 2012–2014: Iceland (Women's)
- 2012–2015: Grindavík (Men's)
- 2014–2015: Grindavík (Women's)
- 2016–2018: Keflavík (Women's)
- 2018–2019: Keflavík (Men's)
- 2022: Grindavík (Men's)
- 2022–2023: Keflavík (Men's, assistant)
- 2023–2024: Keflavík (Women's)

Career highlights
- As player: 2x Úrvalsdeild Defensive Player of the Year (2003, 2004); 3x Icelandic champion (2003–2005); 2× Icelandic Basketball Cup (2003, 2004); As coach: Úrvalsdeild karla Coach of the year (2013); Úrvalsdeild kvenna Coach of the Year (2012); Icelandic men's champion (2013); 4x Icelandic women's champion (2005, 2012, 2017, 2024); Icelandic Men's Basketball Cup (2014); 4x Icelandic Women's Basketball Cup (2012, 2017, 2018, 2024)
Medals
Head Coach for Iceland
women's national basketball team
Games of the Small States of Europe
Silver medal – second place	2013 Luxembourg	Team

Sverrir Þór Sverrisson (born 23 May 1975) is an Icelandic former basketball coach and player. A two-time Úrvalsdeild Defensive Player of the Year, he played several seasons in the Icelandic top-tier, winning national championship three times and the national cup twice. Following his playing career, he turned to coaching where he won several accolades and titles. As a coach he has won the Icelandic women's championship four times and the men's national championship once.

== Coaching career ==
Sverrir retired from top level play in 2010 and took over as head coach of Njarðvík women's team. He led them to the national championship in 2012. In January 2016, Sverrir was hired as the head coach of Úrvalsdeild kvenna club Keflavík, replacing Margrét Sturlaugsdóttir. He led the club to victory in the Icelandic Basketball Cup on 11 February 2017, and to the national championship on 26 April the same year.

On 5 April 2018 Sverrir was hired as the head coach of Keflavík men's team.

He unexpectedly resigned from Keflavík in May 2019.

He returned to coaching during the 2023–2024 season, guiding Keflavík to both the national championship and national cup. Following the season, he announced his retirement from coaching.

== Icelandic national team ==
=== Playing career ===
Between 2002 and 2003, Sverrir played eight games for the Icelandic national team.

=== Coaching ===
Sverrir was hired as the head coach of the Icelandic women's national basketball team in 2012. He led the team to second-place finish in the 2013 Games of the Small States of Europe. Sverrir resigned in 2014 with one year left on his contract after finding out the Icelandic Basketball Federation was actively looking for his replacement.

On 25 February 2022, Sverrir was hired as the head coach of Grindavík, replacing recently fired Daníel Guðmundsson.

In June 2022, he was hired as an assistant coach to Keflavík men's team.

On 21 May 2023, Sverrir was hired as the head coach of Keflavík women's team.

== Awards, titles and accomplishments ==
=== Individual awards ===
==== As player ====
- Úrvalsdeild karla Defensive Player of the Year (2): 2003, 2004
- Úrvalsdeild karla Young Player of the Year: 1994
- Úrvalsdeild karla Sportmanship Award: 1993

==== As coach ====
- Úrvalsdeild karla Coach of the Year: 2013
- Úrvalsdeild kvenna Coach of the Year: 2012

=== Titles ===
==== As player ====
- Icelandic men's champion (3): 2003, 2004, 2005
- Icelandic Basketball Cup (2): 2003, 2004
- Icelandic Supercup (3): 1995, 2003, 2008
- Icelandic Company Cup (3): 2000, 2003, 2007

==== As coach ====
- Icelandic men's champion: 2013
- Icelandic women's champion (3): 2005, 2012, 2017
- Icelandic Men's Basketball Cup: 2014
- Icelandic Women's Basketball Cup (4): 2012, 2017, 2018, 2024
- Icelandic Men's Basketball Supercup (2): 2012, 2013
- Icelandic Women's Basketball Supercup (3): 2004, 2005, 2017
- Icelandic Women's Company Cup: 2004
