= Guðjón Skúlason =

Icelandic basketball player and coach

Personal information
- Born: 1 January 1967 (age 59)

Career information
- College: Auburn Montgomery (1990–1992)
- Playing career: 1983–2006
- Position: Guard
- Coaching career: 2003–2011

Career history

Playing
- 1983–1994: Keflavík
- 1994–1995: Grindavík
- 1995–2003: Keflavík
- 2004: Keflavík-b
- 2005: Léttir
- 2005–2006: Keflavík
- 2006: Keflavík-b

Coaching
- 2003–2004: Keflavík
- 2005–2006: Keflavík (assistant)
- 2006–2007: Iceland
- 2009–2011: Keflavík

Career highlights
- As player: Icelandic Basketball Player of the Year (1997); Úrvalsdeild Domestic All-First team (1990); 6× Icelandic championship (1989, 1992, 1993, 1997, 1999, 2003); 5× Icelandic Cup (1993–1995, 1997, 2003); 4× Icelandic Company Cup (1996–1998, 2002); Icelandic Super Cup (1997); As head coach: Icelandic championship (2004); Icelandic Cup (2004); Icelandic Super Cup (2003)

Career Úrvalsdeild karla playing statistics
- Points: 6,649 (16.3 ppg)
- Games: 409

Career coaching record
- Úrvalsdeild karla: 48–18 (.727)

Guðjón Skúlason (born 1 January 1967) is an Icelandic retired basketball player and coach and a former member of Icelandic national team. He played nineteen seasons in the Úrvalsdeild karla, winning the Icelandic championship six times with Keflavík. He was named the Icelandic Basketball Player of the Year in 1997.

== Playing career ==
=== College career ===
In 1990, Guðjón joined the Auburn University at Montgomery and played for the Auburn Montgomery Warhawks. Despite having joined AUM, Guðjón played with Keflavík during the 1991 Cup finals and the 1991 Úrvalsdeild playoffs. During the playoffs, he averaged 11.3 points in 8 games.

=== Club career ===
Guðjón played 19 seasons in the Úrvalsdeild karla, averaging 16.3 points in 409 games. His best statistical season came in 1989–1990 when he averaged 25.8 points per game.

In October 2002, he became the first player to make 900 three point shots in the Úrvalsdeild. After the 2002–2003 season, he became co-coach of Keflavík with Falur Harðarson and announced he would not continue playing with the team. He appeared in one game during the 2003–2004 season, a Cup game on 29 November 2003 against Þróttur Vogum, where he scored 11 points in Keflavík's 86-136 victory.

After starting the 2005–2006 season with Léttir in the 2. deild karla, Guðjón returned to Keflavík in November 2005 as an assistant coach and player. On 26 February 2006, he broke Teitur Örlygsson record for most games played in the Úrvalsdeild when he played his 406th game. The record would later be broken by Marel Örn Guðlaugsson.

=== National team career ===
From 1988 to 1999, Guðjón played 122 games for the Icelandic national team.

== Coaching career ==
Guðjón coached Keflavík during the 2003–2004 season along with Falur Harðarson and together they guided the team to the 2004 national championship. He coached the team again from 2009 to 2011, taking the team to the playoffs in both seasons.

== Awards and accomplishments ==
=== Titles ===
- Icelandic championship (6): 1989, 1992, 1993, 1997, 1999, 2003
- Icelandic Cup (5): 1993, 1994, 1995, 1997, 2003
- Icelandic Company Cup (4): 1996, 1997, 1998, 2002
- Icelandic Super Cup: 1997

=== Individual awards ===
- Icelandic Basketball Player of the Year: 1997
- Úrvalsdeild Domestic All-First team: 1990
