= Nick Bradford =

American basketball player (born 1978)

Personal information
- Born: August 25, 1978 (age 48)
- Listed height: 6 ft 7 in (2.01 m)
- Listed weight: 200 lb (91 kg)

Career information
- High school: Fayetteville (Fayetteville, Arkansas)
- College: Kansas (1996–2000)
- NBA draft: 2000: undrafted
- Playing career: 2000–2011
- Position: Small forward

Career history
- 2001–2003: Kansas City Knights
- 2003–2005: Keflavík
- 2005–2007: Reims Champagne Basket
- 2008–2009: Grindavík
- 2009–2010: CSU Sibiu
- 2009–2010: Njarðvík
- 2010: Keflavík
- 2011: Grindavík

Career highlights
- Úrvalsdeild Foreign Player of the Year (2009); 2x Icelandic League champion (2004, 2005); Icelandic Basketball Cup winner (2004); Icelandic Super Cup winner (2003); Fourth-team Parade All-American (1996); Mr. Basketball of Arkansas (1996)

Nicholas Evans Bradford (born August 25, 1978) is an American former professional basketball player. At 6 foot 7 inches in height, he played at small forward.

== High school career ==
Bradford is from Fayetteville, Arkansas. He played for his high school, Fayetteville Bulldogs and for AAU teams. Both Gatorade and Scholastic Sports Magazine named Bradford Arkansas Player of the Year. He was also named fourth team Parade magazine All-American. Bradford's final list of college choices was the University of Kansas, Oklahoma State, Arkansas, and Connecticut. He has stated that he choose Kansas because it is fairly close to home and had a good coach, Roy Williams.

== College career ==
At Kansas played at the small forward position for the Kansas Jayhawks men's basketball team. His freshman year, 1997, his roommate was Paul Pierce and Bradford served as Pierce's back up. He has stated that: "I think playing against Paul helped me get better. It helped my confidence. After guarding him every day, I knew I could guard anybody." His freshman year he played in 34 games and averaged 2.3 points a game. The 1997 team had a 35–4 season. His sophomore season at Kansas, he averaged about 4.2 points and 2.5 rebounds a game. His 1998–99 season, his junior year, Bradford averaged 9.1 points and 6.1 rebounds a game. His senior year, he played on a Kansas team that included Nick Collison, Drew Gooden, and Kirk Hinrich. He averaged 7.6 points and 4.8 rebounds. In 2000, he was named honorable mention All-Big 12 and the team gave him the "Phog Allen MVP Award" In his final regular season home game, on March 5, 2000, Bradford hit six of eight shots from the floor and scored 15 points for Kansas, assisting the Drew Gooden-led Jayhawks to an 83–82 win over the University of Missouri Tigers.

== Professional career ==
=== American Basketball Association ===
Bradford played for the minor league Kansas City Knights, which was coached by former Kansas Jayhawks player Kevin Pritchard from 2001 to 2003.

=== Europe ===
In 2003, he signed with the Icelandic Úrvalsdeild club Keflavík and played there for two seasons, averaging 19,7 points and 8,9 rebounds per game. He returned to Iceland in 2008 and played the next three seasons for Grindavík, Njarðvík and Keflavík. After the 2008–2009 season he was voted as the Foreign Player of the year in Iceland. Besides Iceland, Bradford played professionally in Romania, France and Finland. He retired from playing following the 2010–2011 season.

=== Coaching career ===
In 2011, Bradford joined the Labette Community College (Parsons, KS) Cardinals of the Kansas Jayhawk Community College Conference coaching staff as an assistant coach. In July 2013, he accepted the assistant coaching position at Missouri Southern State University (MSSU) in Joplin, Mo. In April 2016, he accepted a head coaching position coaching boys at Mexico High School in Missouri. In 2017 he accepted the women's head coaching position at Olathe North.

Bradford is now an assistant coach for Arkansas in his hometown, serving on the staff of Kelsi Musick after being hired by previous coach Mike Neighbors.
