= Lewis Clinch =

American basketball player

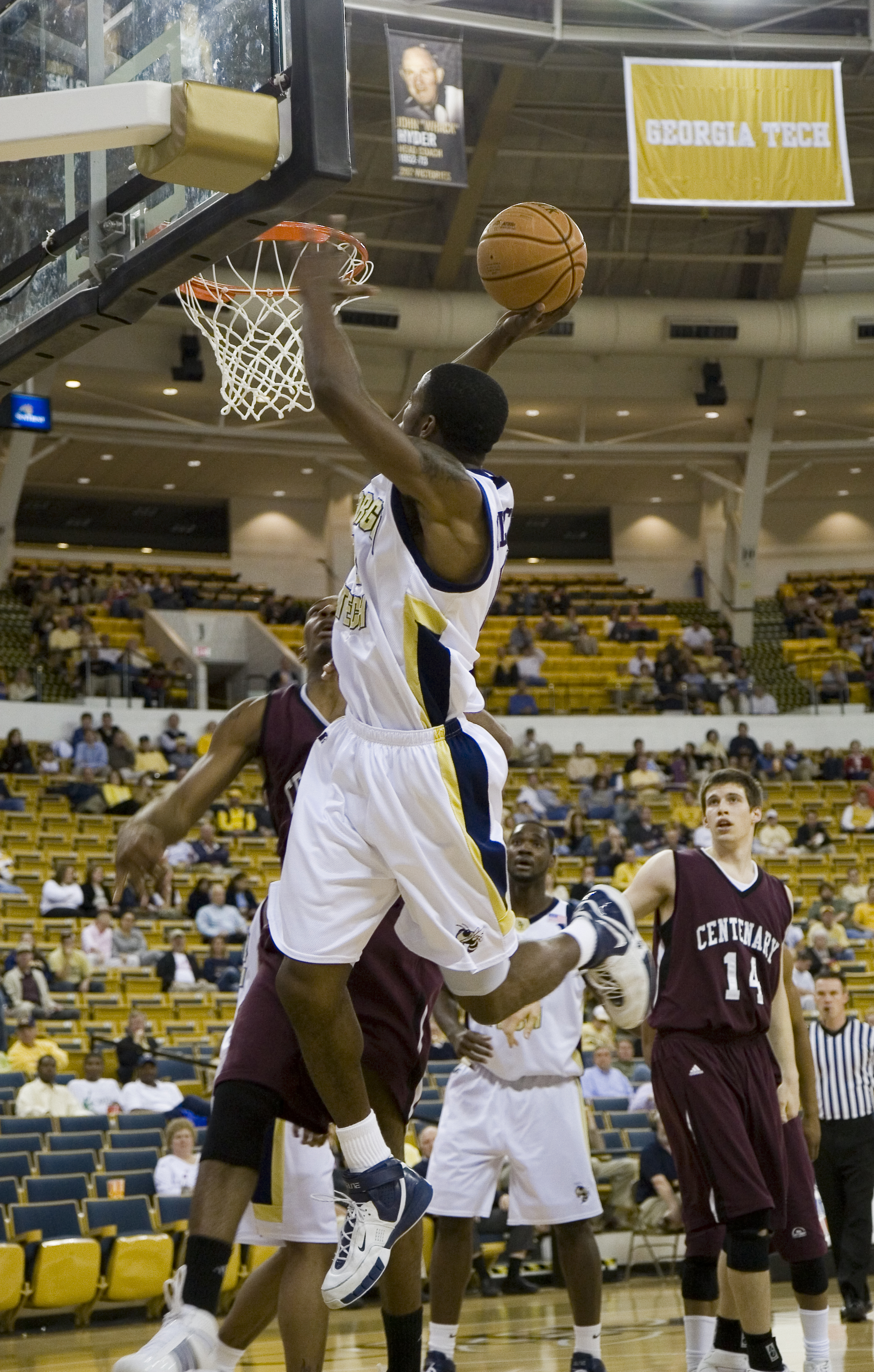

Personal information
- Born: June 29, 1987 (age 39) Cordele, Georgia
- Listed height: 191 cm (6 ft 3 in)
- Listed weight: 88 kg (194 lb)

Career information
- High school: Crisp County (Cordele, Georgia)
- College: Georgia Tech (2005–2009)
- NBA draft: 2009: undrafted
- Playing career: 2009–present
- Position: Guard
- Number: 11

Career history

Playing
- 2009–2011: Austin Toros
- 2011: Maine Red Claws
- 2011–2012: Hapoel Lev Hasharon
- 2012: Caciques de Humacao
- 2012: Caneros de La Romana
- 2013: Bameso
- 2013–2014: Grindavík
- 2014–2015: Fukushima Firebonds
- 2016–2017: Grindavík
- 2018–2019: Grindavík

Coaching
- 2014: Grindavík

Career highlights
- As player: Icelandic Basketball Cup winner (2014)

Earnest Lewis Clinch Jr. (born June 29, 1987) is an American former professional basketball player. He won the Icelandic Basketball Cup with Grindavík in 2014 en led the team to the Úrvalsdeild finals in 2014 and 2017, where it lost to KR both times.

== Playing career ==
=== College career ===
Clinch played college basketball for Georgia Tech from 2005 to 2009. In 93 games he averaged 11.3 points per game. During his senior season, he started all 24 games and averaged 15.5 points, 3.5 rebounds and 3.0 assists per game.

=== Club career ===
His first professional stop was with the Austin Spurs of the D-League where he played from 2009 until he was waived by the club in February 2011. He was shortly later picked up by the Maine Red Claws, where he finished the season. He spent 2011–2012 season with Hapoel Lev Hasharon in Israel's National League and averaged 22.7 ppg and 4.9 rpg in 18 games. He left the team in February 2012 and signed with Caciques de Humacao of the Baloncesto Superior Nacional where he averaged 12.9 points and 3.9 assists in 7 games. Later that year, he signed with Caneros de La Romana in the Liga Nacional de Baloncesto and in early 2013 he signed with Bameso from the Dominican Republic's District National.

In 2013, Clinch signed with reigning Icelandic champions Grindavík. On February 22, 2014, he won the Icelandic Basketball Cup with the club, posting 20 points and 9 assists in Grindavík's 89–77 victory against ÍR. The club advanced to the Úrvalsdeild finals for the third straight season but lost to KR, 3–1.

In August 2014, Clinch signed with the Fukushima Firebonds of the Japanese bj league.

Clinch signed back with Grindavík in September 2016. The team was not expected to be contenders but behind his play it returned to the Úrvalsdeild finals, for the first time since 2014, where they met KR again. After losing the first two games of the series, Grindavík won the next two and tied the series at 2 games apiece. In the fifth and deciding game, KR blew out Grindavík, 95–56, and won its fourth consecutive title. He did not return to the club the following season after contract negotiations broke down between the sides and Grindavík signed Rashad Whack in his place.

On October 13, 2018, Clinch returned to Grindavík in place of recently injured Terrell Vinson. On 24 January 2019, Grindavík was fined 50.000 ISK for Clinch's Tweet on 7 January regarding the officiating in a game between Njarðvík and Keflavík.

== Coaching career ==
Clinch took over as head coach of Grindavík women's team, with the team in second-to-last place with six games left of the 2013–14 Úrvalsdeild kvenna season. Under him, the team won 3 of its last 6 games and staved off relegation to 1. deild kvenna.
