= Álftanes (men's basketball) =

- Leagues: Úrvalsdeild karla
- Founded: 2007
- Arena: Kaldalónshöllin
- President: Huginn Freyr Þorsteinsson
- Website: https://www.umfa.is
Home	Away

The Álftanes men's basketball team, commonly known as Álftanes, is a basketball club in Álftanes, Iceland, founded in 2007. It is the basketball department of Ungmennafélag Álftaness, and the team competes in the Úrvalsdeild karla, the top flight of Iceland.

== Recent history ==
=== 2017–2018 ===
On April 8, 2018, Álftanes star player, Kjartan Atli Kjartansson, hit a go-ahead three-pointer in the waning seconds of its game against Stál-úlfur in the 3. deild karla semi-finals, helping them to victory and promotion to 2. deild karla. In the finals, Álftanes beat Vestri-b for the 3. deild championship.

=== 2018–2019 ===
On July 20, 2018, the club hired Hrafn Kristjánsson, who guided KR to the national championship in 2011, as its head coach. On 17 September 2018, it was reported that former 1. deild karla scoring champion and two-time Icelandic Cup winner, Marvin Valdimarsson, had signed with the team. They started the 2. deild season with a bang, thrashing former 1. deild karla club Körfuknattleiksfélag ÍA with 64 points, 136–72. On 16 April 2019, Álftanes defeated ÍA in the 2. deild karla finals, 123–100, and achieved promotion to the 1. deild karla.

=== 2019–2020 ===
On 12 June 2019, Álftanes signed Úrvalsdeild karla all-time leader in assists, Justin Shouse. On 22 July 2019, the team signed former 1. deild karla scoring champion Samuel Prescott Jr. On 16 August 2019, the team signed former Úrvalsdeild players Birgir Björn Pétursson and Þorsteinn Finnbogason. Two days later, the team signed 6-time national champion Vilhjálmur Kári Jensson from KR.

=== 2020–2021 ===
On 2 October 2021, forward Þorsteinn Finnbogason scored 10 three pointers for Álftanes in a victory against Vestri. The team finished fifth in the league with a 9–7 record and bowed out in the first round of the promotion playoffs against Skallagrímur.

=== 2021–2022 ===
On 4 January 2022, the team signed Sinisa Bilic who had started the season with Breiðablik and played in the Úrvalsdeild since 2019. Following Álftanes' loss against Höttur in the 1. deild promotion playoffs in April 2022, head coach Hrafn Kristjánsson announced his retirement from coaching.

=== 2022–2023 ===
In May 2022, Kjartan Atli Kjartansson was hired as the head coach of the men's team. On 13 March 2023, Álftanes secured victory in the 1. deild karla and achieved promotion to the top-tier Úrvalsdeild karla for the first time in its history. After the season, Dúi Þór Jónsson was named the 1. deild karla Domestic Player of the Year while he and Eysteinn Bjarni Ævarsson where named to the Domestic All-First team and Kjartan Atli was named as the Coach of the Year.

=== 2023–2024 ===
On 17 May 2023, Álftanes signed Icelandic national team member Hörður Axel Vilhjálmsson. On 23 May, it was confirmed that Kjartan Atli would continue to coach the team during its first season in the Úrvalsdeild. The following day, Álftanes signed Icelandic national team player Haukur Helgi Pálsson who had spent the previous two seasons with Njarðvík. In August the team hired Helgi Jónas Guðfinnsson, who in 2012 guided Grindavík to the national championship, as an assistant coach.

== Trophies and achievements ==
- 1. deild karla
  - Winners: 2023
- 2. deild karla
  - Winners: 2019
  - Runner-up: 2014
- 3. deild karla
  - Winners: 2018

=== Awards ===
- 1. deild karla Domestic Player of the Year
  - Dúi Þór Jónsson– 2023
  - Eysteinn Bjarni Ævarsson – 2022
- 1. deild karla Domestic All-First Team
  - Dúi Þór Jónsson– 2023
  - Eysteinn Bjarni Ævarsson – 2022, 2023
  - Ólafur Ingi Styrmisson – 2022
  - Róbert Sigurðsson – 2021
- 1. deild karla Coach of the Year
  - Kjartan Atli Kjartansson– 2023

== Coaches ==
- (Iceland) Hrafn Kristjánsson 2018–2022
- (Iceland) Kjartan Atli Kjartansson 2022–2025
- (Iceland) Hjalti Vilhjálmsson 2025–2026
- (Iceland) Baldur Þór Ragnarsson 2026–present

== Notable players ==
Note: Flags indicate national team eligibility at FIBA-sanctioned events. Players may hold other non-FIBA nationalities not displayed.

Criteria

To appear in this section a player must have either:

- Set a club record or won an individual award while at the club
- Played at least one official international match for their national team at any time
- Played at least one official NBA match at any time.

- (Iceland) Haukur Pálsson
- (Iceland) Hörður Axel Vilhjálmsson
- (Iceland) Ragnar Nathanaelsson
- (Iceland) Tómas Þórður Hilmarsson
- (Finland) Shawn Hopkins
- (Finland) Ville Tahvanainen
- (United States) Justin James

== Recent seasons ==
Season	Tier	League	Pos.	W–L	Playoffs	Icelandic Cup
2009–10	3	2. deild karla Group B	1st	13–2	3rd place	1st Round
2010–11	3	2. deild karla Group B	6th	6–10	DNQ	1st Round
2011–12	3	2. deild karla Group B	6th	7–9	DNQ	2nd Round
2012–13	Did not participate					
2013–14	3	2. deild karla Group A	4th	6–6	Runner-up	1st Round
2014–15	3	2. deild karla Group A	6th	5–9	DNQ	1st Round
2015–16	Did not participate					
2016–17	4	3. deild karla	4th	6–8	DNQ	1st Round
2017–18	4	3. deild karla	4th	8–4	Champions	1st Round
2018–19	3	2. deild karla	1st	16–2	Champions	1st Round
2019–20	2	1. deild karla	5th	12–11	N/A^{1}	2nd Round
2020–21	2	1. deild karla	5th	9–7	1st Round	2nd Round
2021–22	2	1. deild karla	4th	16–11	3rd place	1st Round
2022–23	2	1. deild karla	1st	22–5	N/A^{2}	1st Round
2023–24	1	Úrvalsdeild karla	6th	13–9	1st round	
2024–25	1	Úrvalsdeild karla	6th	11–11	Semi-finals	

Notes
^{1} The team had secured a spot in the playoffs when the season was canceled due to the coronavirus pandemic in Iceland.
^{2} Promoted to Úrvalsdeild karla.
