= Arnar Freyr Jónsson =

Icelandic basketball player (born 1983)

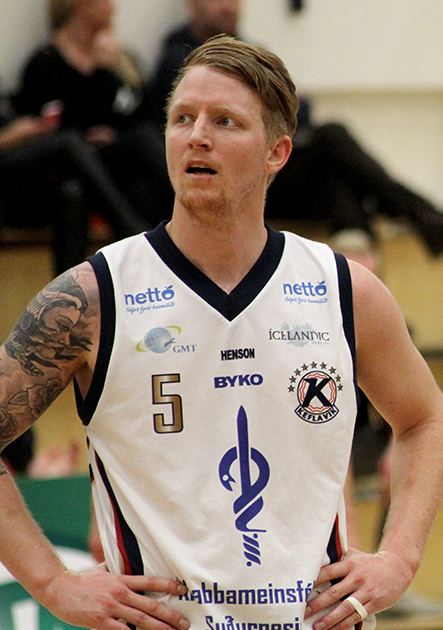
- Arnar with Keflavík in 2015.

Personal information
- Born: 25 May 1983 (age 43) Reykjavík
- Listed height: 184 cm (6 ft 0 in)
- Listed weight: 75 kg (165 lb)

Career information
- Playing career: 2000–2019
- Position: Point guard
- Number: 5, 9

Career history
- 2000–2008: Keflavík
- 2008–2010: Grindavík
- 2010–2011: Aabyhøj
- 2011–2012: Keflavík
- 2012–2013: BC Aarhus
- 2013–2015: Keflavík
- 2017–2019: Njarðvík-b

Career highlights
- 4× Icelandic championship (2003–2005, 2008); 3× Icelandic Cup (2003, 2004, 2012); 3× Icelandic Company Cup (2002, 2006, 2009); Icelandic Basketball Supercup (2003)

Arnar Freyr Jónsson (born 25 May 1983) is an Icelandic basketball player and a former member of the Icelandic national basketball team. He played 15 seasons in the Úrvalsdeild karla and won the Icelandic championship four times and the Icelandic Basketball Cup three times.

In August 2012, Arnar joined BC Aarhus. On 22 September 2012 he set the Basketligaen single game record for assists when he had 16 for BC Aarhus against Aalborg Vikings.

After his Úrvalsdeildar career ended, Arnar Freyr played for Division II club Njarðvík-b.

== National team career ==
From 2004 to 2006, Arnar played 26 games for the Icelandic national basketball team.
