= Körfuboltakvöld =

- Starring: Kjartan Atli Kjartansson; Pálína Gunnlaugsdóttir; Bryndís Guðmundsdóttir; Hermann Hauksson; Sævar Sævarsson; Teitur Örlygsson
- Country of origin: Iceland

Production
- Producer: Garðar Örn Arnarson

Original release
- Network: Stöð 2 Sport (2015–present)
- Release: 14 October 2015 – present

Körfuboltakvöld (English: Basketball Night), known as Bónus's Körfuboltakvöld for sponsorship reasons, is the postgame show for Úrvalsdeild karla and Úrvalsdeild kvenna broadcasts. Originally known as Domino's Körfuboltakvöld, the program featured hosts Kjartan Atli Kjartansson and Pálína Gunnlaugsdóttir with analysts Hermann Hauksson, Sævar Sævarsson, Kristinn Friðriksson, Fannar Ólafsson and Teitur Örlygsson, with supporting or fill-in analysts including Benedikt Guðmundsson and Ágúst Björgvinsson. In October 2020, he received the Eddan award for best television material of the year in the general election of Icelandic television viewers.

== Recurring segments ==
- Fannar skammar (English: Fannar shames) – A blooper segment where Fannar Ólafsson goes over previous games bloopers and failures.
- Framlenging (English: Overtime) – A discussion segment where each analyst has 30 seconds to explain his opinion on a certain topic.

== Current hosts ==
- Stefán Árni Pálsson – men's show
- Ólöf Helga Pálsdóttir – women's show

=== Analysts ===
- Benedikt Guðmundsson – analyst
- Berglind Gunnarsdóttir – analyst
- Bryndís Guðmundsdóttir – analyst
- Fannar Ólafsson – analyst and Fannar skammar presenter
- Helgi Már Magnússon – analyst
- Kristinn Friðriksson – analyst
- Ólöf Helga Pálsdóttir – analyst
- Ragna Margrét Brynjarsdóttir – analyst
- Finnur Freyr Stefánsson – fill-in analyst
- Ágúst Björgvinsson – fill-in analyst
- Darri Freyr Atlason – analyst
- Friðrik Ragnarsson – analyst
- Hermann Hauksson – analyst
- Jón Halldór Eðvaldsson – analyst
- Matthías Orri Sigurðarson – analyst
- Ómar Örn Sævarsson – analyst
- Pavel Ermolinskij – analyst
- Sævar Sævarsson – analyst
- Teitur Örlygsson – analyst

=== Former hosts ===
- Kjartan Atli Kjartansson
- Pálína Gunnlaugsdóttir
- Hörður Unnsteinsson
