= Egill Jónasson =

Icelandic basketball player

Personal information
- Born: 1 June 1984 (age 42) Iceland
- Listed height: 217 cm (7 ft 1 in)

Career information
- Playing career: 2002–2014
- Position: Center

Career history
- 2002–2008: Njarðvík
- 2008: Horsens IC
- 2009–2011: Njarðvík
- 2013–2014: Njarðvík

Career highlights
- Icelandic Champion (2006); Icelandic Basketball Cup (2005); 4× Icelandic Super Cup (2002, 2004–2006); 2× Icelandic Company Cup (2003, 2005); 2× Úrvalsdeild blocks leader (2006, 2008)
Medals
Men's basketball
Representing Iceland
Games of the Small States of Europe
| Silver medal – second place | 2005 Andorra | Team |

Egill Jónasson (born 1 June 1984) is an Icelandic former basketball player and a former member of the Icelandic national basketball team. During his career he won the Icelandic championship and Icelandic Basketball Cup with Njarðvík. Variously listed as 216–218 cm, he is one of the tallest basketball players in Iceland's history.

== Career ==
Egill started his career with Njarðvík in the Úrvalsdeild karla in 2002. He helped the team win the Icelandic Basketball Cup in 2005 and the Icelandic championship in 2006. As one of the tallest player in the country, he quickly became known for his blocking ability and led the Úrvalsdeild in blocks in 2006 and 2008.

In February 2008, Egill underwent a surgery on his knee causing him to miss a month. In June 2008, he moved to Denmark to attend a school in Horsens and signed with Horsens IC but missed most of the season due to injuries. He returned to Njarðvík in 2009.

After the 2010–11 season, Egill took a break from basketball to focus on his studies and recuperating his troublesome knee. He returned to Njarðvík for one final season in 2013.

== National team career ==
From 2005 to 2006, Egill played 23 games for the Icelandic national basketball team.

== Personal life ==
Egill's father is former Icelandic national team and Njarðvík's player Jónas Jóhannesson.
