= 2022–23 Icelandic Men's Basketball Cup =

2022–2023 Bikarkeppni Karla
Tournament details
- Arena: Laugardalshöll (Final four); Reykjavík, Iceland
- Dates: 16 October 2022 – 14 January 2023

Final positions
- Champions: Valur
- Runners-up: Stjarnan

Awards and statistics
- MVP: (Iceland) Kári Jónsson
- Top scorer(s): (Iceland) Kári Jónsson (United Kingdom) Callum Lawson

The 2022–2023 Bikarkeppni karla, named Vís bikarinn for sponsorship reasons, was the 57th edition of the Icelandic Men's Basketball Cup, won by Valur against Stjarnan. The competition was managed by the Icelandic Basketball Association (KKÍ) and the final four was played in Laugardalshöll, Reykjavík, and broadcast live on RÚV. Kári Jónsson was named the Cup Finals MVP after turning in 22 points and 7 assists.

== Bracket ==
Quarterfinals
11 December
Stjarnan	98
Skallagrímur	92
12 December
Valur	90
Grindavík	80
12 December
Keflavík	99
Njarðvík	86
12 December
KR	93
Höttur	94

Semifinals
11 January
Stjarnan	89
Keflavík	83
11 January
Höttur	47
Valur	74

Final
14 March
Stjarnan	66
Valur	72

== Cup Finals MVP ==
Pos.	Player	Team
Guard	(Iceland) Kári Jónsson	Valur
