= Einar Árni Jóhannsson =

Icelandic basketball coach (born 1977)

Njarðvík
- Position: Head coach
- League: Úrvalsdeild kvenna

Personal information
- Born: 8 January 1977 (age 49) Iceland

Career history

Coaching
- 1996–1997: Njarðvík (Women's)
- 1997–2000: Njarðvík (Men's, assistant)
- 2001–2003: Njarðvík (Women's)
- 2003–2004: Njarðvík (Men's, assistant)
- 2004–2007: Njarðvík (Men's)
- 2007–2009: Breiðablik (Men's)
- 2010–2014: Njarðvík (Men's)
- 2015–2018: Þór Þorlákshöfn (Men's)
- 2018–2021: Njarðvík (Men's)
- 2021–2024: Höttur (Men's, co-coach)
- 2024–present: Njarðvík (Women's)

Career highlights
- As head coach: Úrvalsdeild Men's Coach of the Year (2007); Úrvalsdeild Women's Coach of the Year (2003); Icelandic champion (Men's) (2006); Icelandic champion (Women's) (2026); Icelandic Men's Basketball Cup (2005); Icelandic Women's Basketball Cup (2025); 5× Icelandic Men's Supercup (2004, 2005, 2006, 2016, 2017); 2× Icelandic Women's Supercup (2002, 2025); As assistant coach: Icelandic champion (Men's) (1998); Icelandic Men's Basketball Cup (1999); Icelandic Men's Supercup (1999)

Einar Árni Jóhannsson (born 8 January 1977) is an Icelandic basketball coach. He won the Icelandic men's championship in 1998 with Njarðvík as an assistant to Friðrik Ingi Rúnarsson, and in 2006 as Njarðvík's head coach. He won the Icelandic Men's Basketball Cup in 2005 with Njarðvík and was named the Úrvalsdeild karla Coach of the Year in 2007.

== Coaching career ==
Einar served as an assistant coach to Njarðvík's men's team from 1997 to 2000 and from December 2003 to the end of the 2003–04 season.

In April 2015, Einar signed a three-year contract to coach Þór Þorlákshöfn. On 17 February 2018 Þór announced that Einar would leave his post as head coach at the seasons end and would be replaced by assistant coach Baldur Þór Ragnarsson.

On 25 March 2018 Einar was hired as the head coach of Njarðvík men's team. He left his post at the conclusion of the 2020–21 season. On 18 May 2021, he was hired as a c0-coach of recently relegated Höttur. He left the team following its exit in the 2024 Úrvalsdeild playoffs.

In May 2024, Einar was hired as the head coach of Njarðvík women's team. He guided Njarðvík to the Úrvalsdeild finals where they lost to Haukar 2–3. On 27 September 2025, he guided the team to victory in the Icelandic Super Cup with Njarðvík.

On 17 May 2026, he guided Njarðvík to the Icelandic championship, defeating Haukar in the Úrvalsdeild finals.

== Personal life ==
Einar is married to Guðmunda Guðlaug Sveinsdóttir.

== Awards and accomplishments ==
=== Club honours ===
- Icelandic Men's Champion (2): 1998^{1}, 2006
- Icelandic Women's Champion: 2026
- Icelandic Men's Basketball Cup (2): 1999^{1}, 2005
- Icelandic Women's Basketball Cup : 2025
- Icelandic Men's Supercup (5): 1999^{1}, 2004, 2005, 2006, 2016, 2017
- Icelandic Women's Supercup: 2002
- Icelandic Men's Company Cup champion: 2005
- Icelandic Men's Division I: 2008

^{1} as an assistant coach

=== Individual awards ===
- Úrvalsdeild Men's Coach of the Year: 2007
- Úrvalsdeild Women's Coach of the Year: 2003
- 1. deild karla Coach of the Year: 2008
