= Hermann Hauksson =

Icelandic basketball player

Personal information
- Born: 24 January 1972 (age 54) Iceland
- Listed height: 198 cm (6 ft 6 in)

Career information
- Playing career: 1990–2002
- Position: Forward
- Coaching career: 2002–2003

Career history

Playing
- 1990–1998: KR
- 1998: Sint-Niklaas
- 1998–2000: Njarðvík
- 2000–2002: KR

Coaching
- 2002–2003: KR (assistant)

Career highlights
- As player: Úrvalsdeild karla Domestic Player of the Year (1997); 2x Úrvalsdeild Domestic All-First team (1996, 1997); 2x Icelandic Cup (1991, 1999); 2x Icelandic Supercup (1999, 2000)

Career Úrvalsdeild karla statistics
- Points: 3,258 (13.6 ppg)
- Rebounds: 1,022 (4.3 rpg)
- Games: 240

Hermann Hauksson (born 24 January 1972) is an Icelandic former basketball player and a former member of Icelandic national team. He played the majority of his career in the Úrvalsdeild karla with KR and Njarðvík but also played in Belgium for Sint-Niklaas. In 1997, he was named the Úrvalsdeild karla Domestic Player of the Year. In 1999, he won the Icelandic Cup with Njarðvík after scoring the game-tying three pointer that sent the game to overtime. He retired following the 2001–2002 season due to lingering back injuries.

Hermann was an analyst for Domino's Körfuboltakvöld from 2015 to 2023.

== Icelandic national team ==
From 1994 to 2000, Hermann played 64 games for the Icelandic national team.

== Personal life ==
Hermann is the father of basketball player and national team member Martin Hermannsson. In 2014, they became the first father-son duo to have been named the Úrvalsdeild karla Domestic Player of the Year.
