= Tómas Þórður Hilmarsson =

Icelandic basketball player

Personal information
- Born: 11 January 1995 (age 31) Bremerhaven, Germany
- Listed height: 201 cm (6 ft 7 in)

Career information
- College: Francis Marion (2016)
- Position: Power forward / center

Career history
- 2010–2020: Stjarnan
- 2011: → FSu
- 2020–2021: Aquimisa Carbajosa
- 2021–2024: Stjarnan
- 2024–2025: Álftanes

Career highlights
- 5x Icelandic Cup (2013, 2015, 2019, 2020, 2022); Icelandic Company Cup (2015)

Tómas Þórður Hilmarsson (born 11 January 1995) is an Icelandic basketball player.

== Playing career ==
Tómas debuted with Stjarnan in the Úrvalsdeild karla during the 2010–2011 season. In February 2015, he won the Icelandic Cup with Stjarnan despite playing with a broken glass in his heel. In 2016 he joined Francis Marion University but returned to Stjarnan in December the same year. During the 2017–2018 season, he averaged a career high 14.7 points and 9.0 rebounds in 22 games.

In July 2020, Tómas signed with Aquimisa Carbajosa of the Spanish LEB Plata. He left the team in end of January 2021 and returned to Iceland. In 14 games, he averaged 6.1 points and 5.1 rebounds per game.

In February 2021, Tómas returned to Stjarnan. On 19 March 2022, he won his fifth Icelandic Basketball Cup when Stjarnan defeated reigning national champions Þór Þorlákshöfn in the 2022 Cup Finals.

In 2024, he signed with Álftanes.

== National team career ==
In November 2017, Tómas was selected to the Icelandic national team for the first time. He played 8 games for the team between 2017 and 2020.

== Honours ==
=== Titles ===
- Icelandic Cup (2013, 2015, 2019, 2020, 2022)
- Icelandic Company Cup (2015)
