= Daníel Guðni Guðmundsson =

Icelandic basketball player and coach

Keflavík
- Title: Head coach
- League: Úrvalsdeild karla

Personal information
- Born: 17 November 1986 (age 39)

Career information
- Playing career: 2004–2016
- Position: Guard
- Coaching career: 2015–present

Career history

Playing
- 2004–2005: Njarðvík
- 2005–2006: FSu
- 2006–2007: Njarðvík
- 2007–2008: Þróttur Vogum
- 2008: Njarðvík
- 2008–2010: Breiðablik
- 2010–2011: Stjarnan
- 2011–2012: IK Eos
- 2013–2016: Grindavík

Coaching
- 2015–2016: Grindavík (w)
- 2016–2018: Njarðvík (m)
- 2018–2019: Grindavík (m) (assistant)
- 2018–2019: Grindavík (w) (assistant)
- 2019–2022: Grindavík (m)
- 2022–2024: Njarðvík (m) (assistant)
- 2024–present: Keflavík (m)

Career highlights
- As player: Icelandic Basketball Cup (2014); 3× Icelandic Super Cup (2004, 2006, 2013)

Daníel Guðni Guðmundsson (born 17 November 1986) is an Icelandic basketball coach and a former player. During his playing career, he won the Icelandic Basketball Cup in 2014, and the Icelandic Super Cup three times, in 2004, 2006 and 2013.

== Playing career ==
Daníel came up through the junior ranks of Njarðvík and appeared in his first senior games with the club during the 2004–2005 Úrvalsdeild karla season. He spent the following season with 1. deild karla club FSu before returning to Njarðvík in 2006.

In 2008, Daníel signed with newly promoted Breiðablik. In 16 games, he averaged 8.6 points and helped Breiðablik to an 8th-place finish and a seat in the playoffs. The following season, Daníel averaged a career high 11.0 points per game but the team was unable to reproduce the previous season success and ended being relegated with a 5–17 record. During the summer, he signed with Stjarnan. Daníel appeared in 32 regular season and playoffs games for Stjarnan, averaging 6.0 points per game, and helping the team reach the 2011 Úrvalsdeild Finals where they eventually lost to KR.

During the summer of 2011, Daníel moved to Sweden and joined IK Eos. He missed all but one game of the 2011–2012 season due to a back injury but appeared in 9 games in the Basketettan for the first half of the 2012–2013 season, averaging 6.1 points per game, before returning to Iceland and signing with Grindavík for the second half of the season. He played for Grindavík until 2016, helping the club win the national championship in 2013.

=== Titles ===
- Icelandic champion
  - 2013
- Icelandic Basketball Cup
  - 2014
- Icelandic Super Cup
  - 2004, 2006, 2013

== Coaching career ==
In 2015, Daníel was hired as the head coach of Grindavík women's team. He guided the team to the Icelandic Cup finals where it lost to Snæfell 78–80. In the Úrvalsdeild playoffs, Grindavík took a commanding 2–0 lead against heavy favorites Haukar in the semi-finals before losing three straight and the series 2–3.

In April 2016, Daníel was hired as the head coach of Njarðvík. His first season at the helm proved to be a disappointing one as Njarðvík missed out on the playoffs for the first time since 1993 after losing to Þór Þorlákshöfn in the last game of the season. The team bounced back the following season, finishing fifth in the league. After being swept by eventual champions KR in the first round of the 2018 playoffs, Njarðvík chose not to give Daníel a contract extension.

After serving as an assistant coach to both Grindavík's men's and women's teams for the 2018–2019 season, Daníel was hired as the head coach Grindavík men's team in April 2019. He guided Grindavík to the Icelandic Cup Finals in February 2020 where it lost to Stjarnan.

On 21 February 2022, Daníel was let go by Grindavík with five games left of the season and the team in 6th place.

In May 2022, Daníel was hired as an assistant coach to Benedikt Guðmundsson at Njarðvík men's team. He left the team at the conclusion of the 2023–2024 season.

In May 2025, Daníel was hired as the head coach of Keflavík men's team.
