= 1997–98 Icelandic Men's Basketball Cup =

1997–98 Bikarkeppni Karla
Tournament details
- Arena: Laugardalshöll (Final); Reykjavík, Iceland
- Dates: 2 November 1997 – 14 February 1998

Final positions
- Champions: Grindavík
- Runners-up: KFÍ

The 1997–98 Bikarkeppni karla, named Reunault-bikarinn for sponsorship reasons, was the 32nd edition of the Icelandic Men's Basketball Cup, won by Grindavík against KFÍ. The competition was managed by the Icelandic Basketball Federation and the final was held in Reykjavík, in the Laugardalshöll on 14 February 1998, and was broadcast live on RÚV.

== Participating teams ==
Thirty-four teams signed up for the Cup tournament.

== Bracket ==
Quarterfinals
11 January
KFÍ	87
ÍR	67
11 January
Valur	79
Stjarnan	75
11 January
Grindavík	87
Haukar	68
11 January
Njarðvík	92
ÍA	71

Semifinals
25 January
Valur	84
Grindavík	101
25 January
KFÍ	99
Njarðvík	70

Final
14 February
KFÍ	71
Grindavík	95
