= Ísak Tómasson =

Icelandic basketball coach and player

Personal information
- Born: 7 May 1964 (age 62) Njarðvík, Iceland
- Listed height: 178 cm (5 ft 10 in)

Career information
- Playing career: 1981–1995
- Position: Point guard
- Number: 13
- Coaching career: 2000–2001

Career history

Playing
- 1981–1995: Njarðvík

Coaching
- 2000–2001: Njarðvík

Career highlights
- As player: 8× Icelandic champion (1982, 1984–1987, 1991, 1994, 1995); 5× Icelandic Cup (1987–1990, 1992); As coach: 1. deild kvenna

Career Úrvalsdeild karla playing statistics
- Points: 2,489 (9.3 ppg)
- Games: 269

Career coaching record
- Úrvalsdeild kvenna: 1–9 (.100)
- 1. deild kvenna: 10–2 (.833)

Ísak Tómasson (born 7 May 1964) is an Icelandic former basketball player and coach.

== Playing career ==
Ísak started his senior team career in 1981 and played for Njarðvík his entire career where he won the national championship eight times and the Icelandic Basketball Cup five times. He retired following the 1994–1995 season where he scored the final points in Njarðvík's championship clinching overtime win against Grindavík.

== Coaching career ==
Ísak led Njarðvík women's team to victory in the second-tier 1. deild kvenna and achieve promotion to the top-tier Úrvalsdeild kvenna. He resigned from his post the following season after a 1–9 start.

== National team career ==
Ísak played 3 games for the Icelandic national team in 1986.
