= Albert Óskarsson =

Icelandic basketball player

Personal information
- Born: 13 June 1968 (age 58)

Career information
- Playing career: 1988–2001
- Position: Forward

Career history
- 1988–2001: Keflavík

Career highlights
- Úrvalsdeild Domestic All-First Team (1997); 4× Icelandic champion (1989, 1992, 1993, 1997); 3× Icelandic Basketball Cup (1993, 1994, 1997); Icelandic Company Cup (1996)

Career Úrvalsdeild karla statistics
- Points: 2,246 (9.8 ppg)
- Games: 230

Albert Óskarsson (born 13 June 1968) is an Icelandic former basketball player. He won the Icelandic championship four times and the Icelandic Basketball Cup three times as a member of Keflavík.

== Club career ==
Albert started his career with Keflavík during the second half of the 1987–1988 season. Following the 1996–1997 season, he played sparingly to focus on his educations. He retired from top-level play in January 2001.

== National team career ==
Albert debuted for the Iceland national team in 1990 and played 38 games for the team until 1997.
