= Kristinn Friðriksson =

Icelandic basketball player and coach

Personal information
- Born: 23 December 1971 (age 54) Iceland
- Listed height: 186 cm (6 ft 1 in)

Career information
- Playing career: 1988–2006
- Position: Shooting guard
- Number: 9
- Coaching career: 2002–2009

Career history

Playing
- 1988–1994: Keflavík
- 1994–1996: Þór Akureyri
- 1996–1997: Keflavík
- 1997–1998: BK Odense
- 1998–1999: Skallagrímur
- 1999–2004: Tindastóll
- 2004: Grindavík
- 2005–2006: Tindastóll

Coaching
- 2002–2004: Tindastóll
- 2004: Grindavík
- 2005–2009: Tindastóll

Career highlights
- As player: Úrvalsdeild Domestic All-First Team (1995); 4x Icelandic champion (1989, 1992, 1993, 1997); 2x Icelandic Cup winner (1993, 1997); As coach: Icelandic Division I champion (2006)

Career Úrvalsdeild karla playing statistics
- Points: 4,782 (15.1 ppg)
- Games: 317

Career coaching record
- Úrvalsdeild karla: 50–70 (.417)

Kristinn Geir Friðriksson (born 23 December 1971) is an Icelandic former basketball player and coach. He is currently a basketball analyst for Domino's Körfuboltakvöld (English: Domino's Basketball Night) on Stöð 2 Sport.

== Club career ==
Kristinn played 17 seasons in the Icelandic top-tier Úrvalsdeild karla. His best season as a player came in 1994-1995 when he finished as the league's third leading scorer, averaging 27.1 points per game for Þór Akureyri, and was selected to the Úrvalsdeild Domestic All-First Team. He was selected to the 1995 Icelandic All-Star game where he scored 51 points.

On 2 May 2001, Kristinn received a one-month suspension from the National Olympic and Sports Association of Iceland after he tested positive for ephedrine.

== National team career ==
Between 1992 and 1994, Kristinn played 13 games for the Icelandic national basketball team.

== Titles and awards ==
=== As player ===
==== Titles ====
- 4x Icelandic League champion (1989, 1992, 1993, 1997)
- 2x Icelandic Cup winner (1993, 1997)
- 2x Icelandic Company Cup winner (1996, 1999)
- Icelandic Division I champion (2006)

==== Awards ====
- Úrvalsdeild Domestic All-First Team (1995)

=== As coach ===
==== Titles ====
- Icelandic Division I champion (2006)
