= Teitur Örlygsson =

Icelandic basketball player and coach

Personal information
- Born: 9 January 1967 (age 59) Keflavík, Iceland

Career information
- Playing career: 1984–2003
- Position: Small forward
- Number: 11
- Coaching career: 1992–2016

Career history

Playing
- 1984–1996: Njarðvík
- 1996–1997: Gymnastikos Larissa
- 1996–2003: Njarðvík

Coaching
- 1992–1993: Njarðvík
- 2000–2001: Njarðvík
- 2007–2008: Njarðvík
- 2008–2014: Stjarnan
- 2014–2016: Njarðvík (Assistant)

Career highlights
- As player: Icelandic Team of the 20th century; Icelandic Basketball Player of the Year (1995); 4x Úrvalsdeild Domestic Player of the year (1989, 1992, 1996, 2000); 11x Úrvalsdeild Domestic All-First team (1989–1996, 1998–2000); 10x Icelandic champion (1984–1987, 1991, 1994, 1995, 1998, 2001, 2002); 7× Icelandic Basketball Cup (1987–1990, 1992, 1999, 2002); 4× Icelandic Supercup (1995, 1999, 2001, 2002); Icelandic Company Cup (2001); Icelandic All-Star Game MVP (1990); As coach: Icelandic champion (2001); 2× Icelandic Basketball Cup (2009, 2013); Icelandic Supercup (2009)

Career Úrvalsdeild karla playing statistics
- Points: 6,597 (16.2 ppg)
- Games: 406

Career coaching record
- Úrvalsdeild karla: 102–58 (.638)
Medals
Men's basketball
Representing Iceland
Games of the Small States of Europe
Bronze medal – third place	1989 Cyprus	National Team
Gold medal – first place	1991 Andorra	National Team
Gold medal – first place	1993 Malta	National Team
Bronze medal – third place	1995 Luxembourg	National Team
Bronze medal – third place	1997 Reykjavík	National Team
FIBA European Championship for Small Countries
Gold medal – first place	1988 Malta	National Team
Gold medal – first place	1990 Wales	National Team
Bronze medal – third place	1994 Ireland	National Team

Teitur Örlygsson (born 9 January 1967) is an Icelandic former professional basketball player and a coach. During his career he won the Icelandic national championships ten times with Njarðvík and the Icelandic Basketball Cup seven times. He spent the 1996–1997 season with Gymnastikos S. Larissas B.C. of the Greek Basketball League.

== Icelandic national team ==
Between 1986 and 2000, Teitur played 118 games for the Icelandic national basketball team.

== Coaching career ==
Teitur started his coaching career with Njarðvík nine games into the 1992–1993 season when he finished the season as a player-coach after the firing of head coach Poul Coltin. He was again a player-coach for Njarðvík, this time along with Friðrik Ragnarsson, when the team won the national championship in 2001. Four years after retiring as a player, ee returned to Njarðvík as a head coach for the 2007–2008 season but was fired after the playoffs.

In December 2008, Teitur was hired as the head coach of Stjarnan. In 2011, he led the club to the Úrvalsdeild finals and in 2009 and 2014 led the club to victory in the Icelandic Cup. He left the club after the 2013–2014 season.

== Personal life ==
Teitur is the brother of former Icelandic national team player Sturla Örlygsson and former Althing member Gunnar Örn Örlygsson. He is also uncle of Örlygur Aron Sturluson and Margrét Kara Sturludóttir who both played for the Icelandic national teams.
