= 2019–20 Icelandic Men's Basketball Cup =

Basketball competition in Iceland

2019–2020 Bikarkeppni Karla
Tournament details
- Arena: Laugardalshöll (Final four); Reykjavík, Iceland
- Dates: 1 November 2019 – 15 February 2020

Final positions
- Champions: Stjarnan
- Runners-up: Grindavík

Awards and statistics
- MVP: (Iceland) Ægir Steinarsson

The 2019–2020 Bikarkeppni karla, named Geysisbikarinn for sponsorship reasons, was the 54th edition of the Icelandic Men's Basketball Cup, won by Stjarnan against Grindavík. The competition was managed by the Icelandic Basketball Federation and the final four was held in Reykjavík, in the Laugardalshöll in February 2020, and was broadcast live on RÚV. Ægir Steinarsson was named the Cup Finals MVP after turning in 19 points and 14 assists.

== Participating teams ==
Twenty-six teams signed up for the Cup tournament.

== Bracket ==
Quarterfinals
20 January
Fjölnir	106
Keflavík	100
20 January
Stjarnan	78
Valur	65
20 January
Sindri	74
Grindavík	93
21 January
Tindastóll	99
Þór Akureyri	69

Semifinals
12 February
Fjölnir	74
Grindavík	93
12 February
Tindastóll	70
Stjarnan	98

Final
15 February
Grindavík	75
Stjarnan	89

== Cup Finals MVP ==
Pos.	Player	Team
Point guard	(Iceland) Ægir Steinarsson	Stjarnan
