= Alex Gilbert =

Alex Gilbert may refer to:

- Alex Gilbert (adoption advocate) (born 1992), New Zealand adoption advocate, writer and presenter.
- Alex Gilbert (basketball) (born 1957), American basketball player
- Alex Gilbert (footballer) (born 2001), Irish footballer
