= 1966 Icelandic Men's Basketball Cup =

1966 Bikarkeppni Karla
Tournament details
- Arena: Hálogaland; Reykjavík
- Dates: August-October 1966

Final positions
- Champions: KR
- Runners-up: ÍKF

The 1966 Bikarkeppni karla was the 2nd edition of the Icelandic Men's Basketball Cup, won by KR after defeating ÍKF in the cup final. The final four was held in Reykjavík, in the Hálogaland arena in october 1966.

== Participating teams ==
The qualification stage was split between the northern, southern, western and capital region part of the country.

On 29 August, Snæfell defeated KFÍ in Stykkishólmur, 75-41, behind Sigurður Hjörleifsson's 26 points. It later defeated Borgarnes to secure a berth in the semi-finals.

Þór Akureyri secured a berth from the northern part and ÍKF from the southern part.

KR advanced from the capital region after facing Ármann and ÍR.

== Bracket ==
Semifinals
15 October
KR	59
Þór Akureyri	42
15 October
Snæfell	44
ÍKF	53

Final
16 October
KR	57
ÍKF	54
