= 2018–19 Icelandic Men's Basketball Cup =

Basketball competition in Iceland

2018–2019 Bikarkeppni Karla
Tournament details
- Arena: Laugardalshöll; Reykjavík, Iceland
- Dates: 13–16 February 2019

Final positions
- Champions: Stjarnan
- Runners-up: Njarðvík

Awards and statistics
- MVP: (United States) Brandon Rozzell

The 2018–2019 Bikarkeppni karla, named Geysisbikarinn for sponsorship reasons, was the 53rd edition of the Icelandic Men's Basketball Cup, won by Stjarnan against Njarðvík. The competition was managed by the Icelandic Basketball Federation and the final four was held in Reykjavík, in the Laugardalshöll in February 2019, and was broadcast live on RÚV. Brandon Rozzell was named the Cup Finals MVP after turning in 30 points and 4 assists.

== Participating teams ==
Twenty-nine teams signed up for the Cup tournament.

== Bracket ==
Quarterfinals
21 January
ÍR	86
Skallagrímur	79
21 January
Njarðvík	87
Vestri	66
21 January
KR	95
Grindavík	65
22 January
Tindastóll	68
Stjarnan	81

Semifinals
14 February
Stjarnan	87
ÍR	73
14 February
KR	72
Njarðvík	81

Final
16 February
Stjarnan	84
Njarðvík	68

== Cup Finals MVP ==
Pos.	Player	Team
Point guard	(United States) Brandon Rozzell	Stjarnan
