= Kjartan Atli Kjartansson =

- Born: 23 May 1984 (age 42); Reykjavík, Iceland
- Occupations: Sports TV and radio show host, basketball coach
- Known for: Domino's Körfuboltakvöld
- Basketball career

Álftanes
- Title: Assistant coach
- League: Úrvalsdeild karla

Personal information
- Listed height: 191 cm (6 ft 3 in)
- Listed weight: 87 kg (192 lb)

Career information
- Playing career: 2001–2021
- Position: Small forward
- Number: 14
- Coaching career: 2011–present

Career history

Playing
- 2001–2002: Stjarnan
- 2002–2004: Haukar
- 2005: Hamar
- 2005–2006: Haukar
- 2007–2011: Stjarnan
- 2011–2012: FSu
- 2012–2013: Stjarnan
- 2014: Álftanes
- 2015–2016: KV
- 2016–2017: Breiðablik
- 2017–2020: Álftanes
- 2021: Álftanes

Coaching
- 2011–2012: FSu (men's)
- 2012–2013: Stjarnan (women's)
- 2014–2015: Stjarnan (men's, assistant)
- 2022–2025: Álftanes (men's)
- 2026–present: Álftanes (men's, assistant)

Career highlights
- As player: 2× Icelandic Cup winner (2009, 2013); Icelandic Super Cup winner (2009); 2. deild karla champion (2019); 3. deild karla champion (2018); As head coach: 1. deild karla champion (2023); As assistant coach: Icelandic Basketball Cup (2015)

Kjartan Atli Kjartansson (born 23 May 1984) is an Icelandic sports TV and radio show host, basketball coach and former player. He hosted Stöð 2 Sport's Domino's Körfuboltakvöld (English: Domino's Basketball Night) from 2015 to 2023 and was the host of the morning radio show Brennslan on FM957 from 2014 to 2020. He played basketball for several season in the Úrvalsdeild karla and won the Icelandic Basketball Cup three times as a member of Stjarnan, in 2009 and 2013 as a player and in 2015 as an assistant coach.

== Early life ==
Kjartan was born in Reykjavík and grew up in Hafnarfjörður and later Álftanes.

== Basketball ==
=== Playing career ===
Kjartan played for nine seasons in the Icelandic top-tier Úrvalsdeild karla, mostly with Stjarnan. He was one of the key players in Stjarnan's resurgence to the basketball scene, helping the club win the Icelandic Basketball Cup in 2009 and 2013, and the Super Cup in 2009. He retired from top-level play in January 2014. On April 8, 2018, he hit a go-ahead three-pointer in the waning seconds of Álftanes game against Stál-úlfur in the Division III semi-finals, helping them to victory and promotion to Division II. On 16 April 2019, he won the Division II championship after Álftanes defeated ÍA in the league finals, 123–100, and achieved promotion to Division I.

In November 2021, Kjartan was called up to Álftanes main squad from the reserve team due to several players missing the game due to COVID-19 protocols. In the 114–91 win, he had 6 points and 5 assists.

=== Coaching career ===
In 2012, Kjartan was hired as head coach for Stjarnan women's team. He led them to a 12–4 record in the Division I, the second best record in the league. In the playoffs they lost Hamar for a seat in the Úrvalsdeild kvenna. Kjartan served as an assistant coach with Stjarnan men's team during the 2014–2015 season, helping it win the Icelandic Basketball Cup in 2015.

In May 2022, Kjartan was hired as the head coach of Álftanes men's team. In his first season, he guided the team to first place in the 1. deild karla and to promotion to the top-tier Úrvalsdeild karla.

On 13 December 2025, he resigned as the head coach of Álftanes the day after it suffered the biggest defeat in Úrvalsdeild history in a 137–78 loss against Tindastóll.

In September 2026, he returned to Álftanes as an assistant coach.

=== National team career ===
Kjartan played 12 games for the Icelandic national U-18 basketball team.

== Music career ==
Kjartan was a member of the Bæjarins bestu hip hop group in the 2000s and performed under the name Kájoð.
