= Gunnar Þorvarðarson =

Icelandic basketball player and coach

Personal information
- Born: 11 June 1951 (age 75) Iceland
- Listed height: 190 cm (6 ft 3 in)

Career information
- Playing career: 1968–1985
- Position: Forward
- Coaching career: 1982–2006

Career history

Playing
- 1968–1969: ÍKF
- 1969–1985: Njarðvík

Coaching
- 1982: Njarðvík
- 1983–1986: Njarðvík
- 1985–1989: Iceland (assistant)
- 1989: Njarðvík
- 1986–1988: Keflavík
- 1990–1992: Grindavík
- 2005–2006: Njarðvík (assistant)

Career highlights
- As player: Úrvalsdeild Domestic Player of the Year (1981); 4× Icelandic Champion (1981, 1982, 1984, 1985); 2× 1. deild winner (1969, 1972); As coach: 3× Icelandic Champion (1984–1986); As assistant coach: Icelandic Champion (2006)

Career coaching record
- Úrvalsdeild karla: 110–41 (.728)

Gunnar Þorvarðarson (born 11 June 1951) is an Icelandic former basketball player and coach and a former member of the Icelandic national basketball team. As a player and coach, he was a member of six national championships with Njarðvík.

== Career ==
Gunnar spent his entire playing career with ÍKF/Njarðvík. In 1983, he became a player-coach for Njarðvík and led the team to three straight national championships. In 1986, he was hired as the head coach of Keflavík. In 1990, Gunnar signed a 2-year contract to coach Grindavík.

In 2005, Gunnar returned to the sidelines as an assistant coach to Einar Árni Jóhannsson with the Njarðvík's team that went on to win the 2006 national championship.

== National team career ==
From 1974 to 1981, Gunnar played 69 games for the Icelandic national basketball team.

== Personal life ==
Gunnar is the father of former Icelandic national team player Logi Gunnarsson.
