= Arnar Jónsson =

Arnar Jónsson may refer to:

- Arnar Jónsson (actor), Icelandic actor
- Arnar Freyr Jónsson, Icelandic basketball player
