= Darrel Lewis =

American and Icelandic basketball player

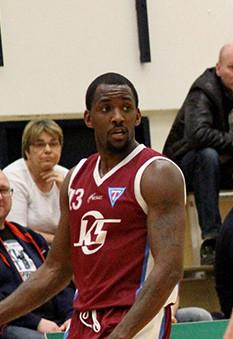
- Lewis in 2015.

Personal information
- Born: February 13, 1976 (age 50) Coatesville, Pennsylvania
- Listed height: 192 cm (6 ft 4 in)
- Listed weight: 86 kg (190 lb)

Career information
- High school: Coatesville Area (Coatesville, Pennsylvania)
- College: Lincoln (1996–1999)
- Playing career: 1999–2017
- Position: Guard/forward

Career history
- 1999: Youngstown Hawks
- 2001–2002: Haaglanden NTNT
- 2002–2005: Grindavík
- 2005–2006: Aironi Novara
- 2006–2007: Sporting Athens
- 2007–2008: Crabs Rimini
- 2008: AEK B.C.
- 2008–2009: Peristeri B.C.
- 2009–2010: Ikaros Kallitheas
- 2010–2011: AEK/Argous
- 2010–2011: OFI
- 2012–2014: Keflavík
- 2014–2016: Tindastóll
- 2016–2017: Þór Akureyri

Career highlights
- Úrvalsdeild Foreign Player of the year (2004); Úrvalsdeild Domestic All-First team (2015); Icelandic Company Cup champion (2013); Greek A2 League champion (2009); Úrvalsdeild scoring champion (2004)
Medals
Men's basketball
Representing Iceland
Games of the Small States of Europe
Silver medal – second place	2005 Andorra	National Team

Darrel Keith Lewis is an American and Icelandic professional basketball player who last played for Þór Akureyri in the Icelandic Úrvalsdeild karla. He was named the Úrvalsdeild Foreign Player of the year in 2004 and selected to the Domestic All-First Team in 2015.

Lewis has reached the Úrvalsdeild finals twice, in 2003 with Grindavík and in 2015 with Tindastóll.

== College career ==
Lewis played for Lincoln University from 1996 to 1999 and ended his career there as the schools the all-time leading scorer with 2,294 points. He was inducted into the Lincoln Lions Athletic Hall of Fame in 2013.

== National team career ==
Lewis became an Icelandic citizen in December 2004 and was selected to the Icelandic national basketball team in 2005. He played four games during the 2005 Games of the Small States of Europe.
