= Callum Lawson =

British basketball player

Leicester Riders
- Position: Small forward
- League: SLB

Personal information
- Born: 27 February 1996 (age 30) Coventry, England
- Listed height: 1.98 m (6 ft 6 in)
- Listed weight: 98 kg (216 lb)

Career information
- College: Western Wyoming CC (2015–2017); Arizona Christian (2017–2019)
- Playing career: 2019–present

Career history
- 2019: Umeå BSKT
- 2020: Keflavík
- 2020–2021: Þór Þorlákshöfn
- 2021–2022: Valur
- 2022: JA Vichy
- 2022–2023: Valur
- 2023–2024: Tindastóll
- 2024–2025: Crailsheim Merlins
- 2025: Keflavík
- 2025–2026: Valur
- 2026–present: Leicester Riders

Career highlights
- 2× Icelandic championship (2021, 2022); Icelandic Cup (2023); NAIA All-Second Team (2019)

Callum Reese Lawson (born 27 February 1996) is a British professional basketball player for the Leicester Riders of the Super League Basketball (SLB). He played college basketball for Western Wyoming Community College and Arizona Christian University before turning pro. In 2021, he won the Icelandic championship as a member of Þór Þorlákshöfn. The following season he repeated as champion, this time with Valur.

== Early career ==
Lawson played basketball for the Birmingham Aces junior teams. In February 2014, he was named the Under-18 National Cup MVP after posting 31 points and 18 rebounds in the Aces' cup finals win against NASSA.

== College career ==
Lawson played two season for Western Wyoming Community College where he was named All-Conference and team MVP after averaging 13.4 points, 8.4 rebounds, and 2.1 assists as a sophomore. In 2017, he joined Arizona Christian University where he averaged 21.6 points and 9.2 rebounds as a senior.

== Club career ==
Following his graduation in 2019, Lawson started his professional career with Umeå BSKT of the Swedish Basketligan. In 15 games, he averaged 7.8 points and 4.1 rebounds per game. In January 2020, he signed with Keflavík. Lawson appeared in 10 league games for Keflavík before the last game of the season and the playoffs where canceled due to the coronavirus pandemic in Iceland. In the 10 games, he averaged 12.4 points and 3.2 rebounds per game.

In April 2020, he signed with Þór Þorlákshöfn. He was a key player for Þór during the season which unexpectedly finished with the second best record in the league. In June 2021, he helped Þór Þorlákshöfn to the national championship after beating favorites and top-seeded Keflavík in the Úrvalsdeild finals.

In September 2021, Lawson signed with Úrvalsdeild club Valur. On 18 May 2022, he won his second straight Icelandic championship after Valur defeated Tindastóll in the finals. He became the third player to win the Icelandic championship two years in a row with separate teams, after Axel Nikulásson and Pálmi Freyr Sigurgeirsson.

In June 2022, Lawson signed with JA Vichy of the LNB Pro B. After struggling during the preseason and in the Leaders Cup, he was released by the club on 11 October. Three days later, he signed back with Valur. On 14 January 2023, he won the Icelandic Cup after Valur defeated Stjarnan in the Cup final.

In August 2023, Lawson signed with Tindastóll.

After starting the 2024–2025 season with Crailsheim Merlins, Lawson signed with Keflavík in February 2025.

In July 2025, he signed with Valur.

== National team career ==
Lawson has played for the Great Britain national Under-20 team.
