= Dedrick Basile =

American basketball player (born 1994)

No. 1 – Álftanes
- Position: Guard
- League: Úrvalsdeild karla

Personal information
- Born: December 2, 1994 (age 31) Houston, Texas, U.S.
- Listed height: 5 ft 10 in (1.78 m)

Career information
- High school: Madison (Houston, Texas)
- College: Trinity Valley CC (2013–2015); Cal State Bakersfield (2015–2017)
- Playing career: 2018–present

Career history
- 2018–2020: Oulu Basket
- 2020–2021: Þór Akureyri
- 2021–2023: Njarðvík
- 2023–2024: Grindavík
- 2024–2026: Tindastóll
- 2026–present: Álftanes

Career highlights
- Icelandic Cup winner (2021); Icelandic Cup MVP (2021); 2× Second-team All-WAC (2016, 2017); 2× WAC All-Defensive team (2016, 2017); WAC All-Newcomer team (2016); WAC tournament MVP (2016)

Dedrick Deon Basile is an American professional basketball player for Álftanes of the Úrvalsdeild karla. He played college basketball for Trinity Valley Community College and the Cal State Bakersfield Roadrunners, before playing professionally in Iceland. In 2021, he won the Icelandic Cup with Njarðvík and was named the Finals MVP.

== College career ==
Basile started his college career with Trinity Valley Community College where he played from 2013 to 2015, when he transferred to California State University, Bakersfield (CSUB). In 2016, he helped CSUB to its first-ever NCAA Division I Tournament appearance and was named the WAC Tournament MVP after scoring 18 points including buzzer-beating three-pointer to win the WAC championship game.

== Professional career ==
Basile started his professional career in 2018 with Oulun NMKY in Finland. During his first season, he averaged 23.7 points, 9.4 rebounds, 4.8 assists and 3.5 steals per game.

After playing for Oulun NMKY for two seasons, Basile joined Icelandic club Þór Akureyri in 2020 where he averaged 19.6 points and 8.7 assists for the 2020–21 Úrvalsdeild karla season.

The following season he stayed in the Úrvalsdeild and joined Njarðvík. He helped the team win the 2021 Icelandic Cup and was named the Cup Finals MVP after scoring 24 points in the final game.

After two seasons with Njarðvík, Basile joined Grindavík in 2023 and went on to average a Úrvalsdeild career high of 22.0 points along with 7.2 assists.

In 2024, Basile joined Tindastóll. For the season, he averaged 18.9 points and 6.4 assists and helped Tindastóll reach the Úrvalsdeild finals, where the team lost to Stjarnan.

In June 2026, Basile signed with Álftanes.

== Achievements ==
=== College ===
==== Titles ====
- WAC Tournament championship: 2016

==== Awards ====
- WAC Tournament MVP: 2016
- WAC All-Tournament Team: 2016, 2017
- All-WAC second team: 2016, 2017
- WAC All-defensive team: 2016, 2017
- WAC All-newcomer team: 2016

=== Professional ===
==== Titles ====
- Icelandic Cup winner: 2021

==== Awards ====
- Icelandic Cup MVP: 2021
- Úrvalsdeild karla steals leader: 2022
