= 1953 Úrvalsdeild karla =

Icelandic Basketball Tournament^{1}
- Duration: April 12, 1953 – April 16, 1953
- Games played: 6
- Teams: 4

Finals
- Champions: ÍKF (2nd title)
- Runners-up: ÍR

Records
- Highest scoring: ÍKF 43-23 ÍR (16 April 1953)
- Winning streak: ÍKF; 3 games
- ^{1} The league changed its name to Úrvalsdeild karla in 1978.

The 1953 Icelandic Basketball Tournament was the 2nd season of the top tier men's basketball league in Iceland. The season started on April 12, 1953 and ended on April 16, 1953. ÍKF won its 2nd title by posting the best record in the league.

== Competition format ==
The participating teams played each other once for a total of 3 games. The top team won the national championship.

== Regular season ==
Pos	Team	Pld	W	L	PF	PA	PD	Pts	Qualification or relegation
1	ÍKF	3	3	0	104	63	+41	6	Champion
2	ÍR	3	2	1	84	79	+5	4	
3	ÍS	3	1	2	60	89	−29	2	
4	Gosi	3	0	3	61	78	−17	0	
