= Axel Nikulásson =

Icelandic basketball player and coach (1962–2022)

Personal information
- Born: 2 June 1962 Akranes, Iceland
- Died: 21 January 2022 (aged 59)

Career information
- College: East Stroudsburg (1983–1987)
- Playing career: 1979–1993
- Coaching career: 1994–1995

Career history

Playing
- 1979–1983: Keflavík
- 1987: Grindavík
- 1987–1989: Keflavík
- 1989–1992: KR
- 1993: Reynir Sandgerði

Coaching
- 1994–1995: KR

Career highlights
- 2x Icelandic champion (1989, 1990); Icelandic cup (1991); 1. deild winner (1982)

Career Úrvalsdeild karla playing statistics
- Points: 1,492 (13.2 ppg)
- Games: 113

Career coaching record
- Úrvalsdeild karla: 22–19 (.537)

Axel Arnar Nikulásson (2 June 1962 – 21 January 2022) was an Icelandic basketball player and coach. He won the Icelandic championship twice, with Keflavík in 1989 and with KR in 1990.

== Early life ==
Axel was born in Akranes in 1962 but grew up in Keflavík.

== Playing career ==
Axel started playing basketball with Keflavík's youth teams around the age of 11. He broke into the first-team in 1979 and helped the team with the second-tier 1. deild in 1982 and achieve promotion to the first-tier Úrvalsdeild karla. During his first Úrvalsdeild season, Axel averaged 18.6 and helped Keflavík finish as the runner-up to the national championship.

The following season, Axel moved to the United States to attend East Stroudsburg University of Pennsylvania where he also played for the school's basketball team, the East Stroudsburg Warriors. He appeared in one Icelandic Cup game for Grindavík in December January 1987 while home on Christmas vacation.

During the summer of 1987, Axel rejoined Keflavík. The following season he quit the team after the controversial firing of head coach Lee Nober. He eventually rejoined the team and helped it win the 1989 national championship.

After the championship, he left Keflavík and signed with KR with whom he won the 1990 national championship.

Axel retired from playing after appearing in three games for Reynir Sandgerði in 1993.

== National team career ==
Between 1980 and 1992, Axel played 63 games for the Icelandic national basketball team.

== Coaching career ==
Axel was hired as the head coach of KR prior to the 1994–1995 season. He led the team to a 16–16 record and a trip to the playoffs. The following season, he stepped down as head coach in November 1995 after a 6–3 start.

== Post basketball career ==
In 1995, Axel started working for the Icelandic Ministry for Foreign Affairs.

Axel died on 21 January 2022, at the age of 59.
