= Guðmundur Þorsteinsson =

Icelandic basketball player and coach (1942–2011)

Personal information
- Born: 1 October 1942 Reykjavík, Kingdom of Iceland
- Died: 16 January 2011 (aged 68)
- Listed height: 200 cm (6 ft 7 in)

Career information
- Playing career: 1958–1965
- Position: Center
- Number: 22

Career history

Playing
- 1958–1965: ÍR

Coaching
- 1968–1969: Iceland
- 1970: KR
- 1971: Njarðvík
- 1972: Iceland
- 1974–1976: Valur

Career highlights
- As player: 5x Icelandic league champion (1960–1964)

Guðmundur Þorsteinsson (1 October 1942 – 16 January 2011) was an Icelandic basketball player and coach. Playing the center position, he was considered one of the best Icelandic basketball players of his generation and was a key player in ÍR's domination of the Icelandic championship in the early sixties. He was forced to retire from basketball at the age of 22 due to a serious illness.

== Basketball career ==
=== Club career ===
Guðmundur was a key member of the ÍR team that did not lose a game in the Icelandic tournament from 1960 to 1964, winning five straight national championships. He was the first Icelander to score in a continental competition when he scored ÍR's first point from a free throw in a 71-17 victory against Collegians from Belfast in the first round of the 1964–65 FIBA European Champions Cup (now called EuroLeague). His last career game came in the first leg of the second round of the Champions Cup against ASVEL on 10 January 1965, where he scored 9 points in a 42-74 loss.

=== National team career ===
Guðmundur played 6 games for the Icelandic national basketball team from 1961 to 1962.

=== Coaching career ===
After his playing career ended, Guðmundur coached Haukar, KR, Njarvík and Valur. He also served as the head coach of the Icelandic men's national basketball team from 1968 to 1969 and again in 1972.

==== Controversies ====
On 14 March 1971 Njarðvík, which was coached by Guðmundur, met KR in their last game of the season. The game was meaningless for both teams, Njarðvík was already relegated and while KR was in second place, rivals ÍR had already secured the first place and the national championship. Before the game, Njarðvík only had four players ready to play so they turned to player of rival team HSK, Sigurður Valur, to fill the fifth spot. KR on the other hand fielded a former player of theirs named Gunnar Gunnarsson, who was playing for Skallagrímur in the second-tier 2. deild karla. In the last minutes of the game one of the Njarðvík's players fouled out so Guðmundur substituted himself in, finishing the game in his dress pants and scoring two points. After the game, the national newspapers were outraged, calling the game The travesty game (Icelandic: Skrípaleikurinn) and lamenting the disrespect by both teams towards the game. In the end the results of the game were nulled and the teams ordered to play it again. In the rematch, KR won a convincing 99-61 victory.

=== Titles ===
- Icelandic Champion: 1960, 1961, 1962, 1963, 1964

== Death ==
Guðmundur died on 16 January 2011, at the age of 68, after battling an unspecific illness.
