= Alex Gilbert (basketball) =

American basketball player

Personal information
- Born: July 3, 1957 (age 69) East St. Louis, Illinois, U.S.
- Listed height: 6 ft 7.5 in (2.02 m)
- Listed weight: 205 lb (93 kg)

Career information
- High school: East St Louis High (East St. Louis, Illinois)
- College: Coffeyville (1976–1978) Indiana State (1978–1980)
- NBA draft: 1980: 6th round, 17th overall pick
- Drafted by: Milwaukee Bucks
- Playing career: 1980–1983
- Position: Power forward / center

Career history

Playing
- 1980–1982: Grindavík
- 1982: Njarðvík

Coaching
- 1982: Njarðvík

Career highlights
- Indiana State University Athletic Hall of Fame (2000); Honorable Mention All-American NJCAA (1977–78); First-team All-KJCCC (1977–78)
- Stats at Basketball Reference

Alexander Gilbert (born July 3, 1957) is an American former professional basketball player and coach. He is a 6 ft 7 ½ in (2.02 m) tall power forward-center.

== College career ==
Gilbert played college basketball at Indiana State University, with the Sycamores, from 1978 to 1980. A two-year starter, he was a critical to the Sycamores compiling a to a 2-year record of 79–55 (.754), a MVC title, a MVC Tourney title and an NCAA National Finals finish. A phenomenal athlete, Gilbert broke up a tight game Virginia Tech in the First Round of the NCAA Tournament, Gilbert's "hook dunk" off a rebound, shook the Sycamores of their lethargy and spurred them to a 17-point victory over the Hokies.

Prior to his Indiana State career; Gilbert spent two seasons at Coffeyville Community College; leading the Red Ravens in scoring and rebounding, (16.7 and 11.2 respectively) – he was tapped for the KJCCC All-Conference team and named All-American (Honorable Mention). He scored 1,605 points while at Coffeyville and was named to the Red Raven Hall of Fame.

Following the 1977–78 season, he signed an NCAA Division I letter of intent with Indiana State, spurning Missouri and Norm Stewart. He totaled 632 points, 447 rebounds, 28 assists, 22 steals, 60 starts in 61 games; his 75 blocks place him 9th on the career list.

== Professional career ==
After being drafted in the 1980 NBA draft, Gilbert played on different Milwaukee Bucks Summer League teams but was cut during training camp. In December 1980, Gilbert signed with Grindavík of the Icelandic second-tier 1. deild karla. In August 1982, he was signed as a player-coach for reigning Icelandic champions Njarðvík of the Úrvalsdeild karla. He was released by Njarðvík in November after appearing in 6 games where he averaged 24.0 points per game. His best performance came in his last game where he scored 42 points against Fram. Following his professional career, Gilbert returned to the United States and began a career in the Corrections industry, eventually moving into Counseling.

In recent years, Gilbert has joined current athletes in the battle for "Likeness & Image" control and reimbursement; he is a co-signee of a landmark legal case versus the NCAA.
