= Auburn Montgomery Warhawks =

College sports team

- University: Auburn University at Montgomery
- Nickname: Warhawks
- NCAA: Division II
- Conference: Gulf South
- Athletic director: Erik Maas
- Location: Montgomery, Alabama
- Varsity teams: 12 (5 men's, 7 women's)
- Basketball arena: AUM Athletics Complex
- Baseball stadium: Q. V. Lowe Field
- Softball stadium: AUM Softball Stadium
- Soccer stadium: AUM Soccer Stadium
- Tennis venue: AUM Tennis Complex
- Mascot: Curtiss the Warhawk
- Website: aumathletics.com
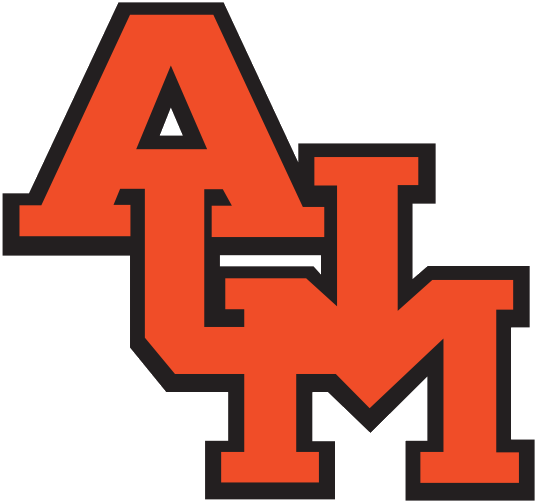

The Auburn Montgomery Warhawks (also AUM Warhawks, formerly Auburn Montgomery Senators) are the athletic teams that represent Auburn University at Montgomery (AUM), located in Montgomery, Alabama, in intercollegiate sports at the Division II level of the National Collegiate Athletic Association (NCAA). The Warhawks have primarily competed in the Gulf South Conference since the 2017–18 academic year.

Auburn Montgomery competes in eleven intercollegiate varsity sports. Men's sports include baseball, basketball, cross country, soccer, and tennis; while women's sports include basketball, cross country, golf, soccer, softball, tennis, and volleyball.

== Move to NCAA Division II ==
Auburn University at Montgomery (AUM) participated in the National Association of Intercollegiate Athletics (NAIA) for approximately 30 years. However, during those 30 years, AUM had routinely explored possible future participation in NCAA Division II. AUM was accepted into the membership process into the NCAA Division II on July 12, 2013, but the decision was reversed on July 26, 2013. AUM was expected to join the Peach Belt Conference in the 2014–15 season, but this was apparently set aside when the NCAA refused to admit the school. However, the school reapplied and was approved to begin the three-year Division II membership process on July 17, 2015 and began the transition with the 2015–16 season, while joining the Gulf South Conference for all sports effective in the 2017–18 season.

== Conference affiliations ==
NAIA

- Independent (1975–1999)
- Southern States Athletic Conference (1999–2016)

NCAA

- Independent (2016–2017)
- Gulf South Conference (2017–present)

== Varsity teams ==
Men's sports	Women's sports
Baseball	Basketball
Basketball	Cross country
Cross country	Soccer
Soccer	Softball
Tennis	Tennis
	Volleyball

== Nickname ==
The teams formerly competed under the name 'Senators' until August 18, 2011, when the college changed its nickname to 'Warhawks.'

== Accomplishments ==
While participating in the NAIA, AUM teams won 25 national championship, 14 by the women's tennis team (1992, 1999, 2000, 2001, 2004, 2005, 2006, 2007, 2008, 2009, 2011, 2012, 2013, 2015), 9 by the men's tennis team (1987, 1995, 1996, 2002, 2004, 2006, 2007, 2008, 2010) and most-recently consecutive championships by the softball team (2014, 2015). In addition, 22 teams finished as national runners-up. Individually, a student-athlete was named to an NAIA All-American team 451 times and 135 times a student-athlete was selected as an NAIA Scholar-Athlete for their work in the classroom. On 32 occasions, an AUM head coach was selected as the National Coach of the Year. AUM teams have won a combined 107 conference or district championships and made 107 NAIA National Tournament appearances.

== Notable alumni ==
=== Men's basketball ===
- Etdrick Bohannon
- Orlando Graham
- Guðjón Skúlason

=== Women's basketball ===
- Erla Þorsteinsdóttir
