= Benedikt Guðmundsson =

Icelandic basketball coach

Personal information
- Born: 19 August 1972 (age 54)
- Coaching career: 1995–present

Career history

Coaching
- 1995–1997: KR (M)
- 1996–1997: KR (W)
- 1997–1998: Grindavík (M)
- 2003–2006: Fjölnir (M)
- 2006–2009: KR (M)
- 2009–2010: KR (W)
- 2010–2015: Þór Þorlákshöfn (M)
- 2015–2017: Þór Akureyri (M)
- 2015–2017: Þór Akureyri (W)
- 2017–2020: KR (W)
- 2019–2025: Iceland (W)
- 2021–2024: Njarðvík (M)
- 2024-2025: Tindastóll (M)

Career highlights
- As coach: 3× Úrvalsdeild karla Coach of the Year (2005, 2009, 2024); 2× Úrvalsdeild kvenna Coach of the Year (2010, 2019); 2× Icelandic men's champion (2007, 2009); Icelandic women's champion (2010); 2× Icelandic Men's Basketball Cup (1998, 2021)
Medals
Women's basketball
Head coach for Iceland
Games of the Small States of Europe
Silver medal – second place	2019 Bar	Coach

Benedikt Rúnar Guðmundsson (born 19 August 1972) is an Icelandic basketball coach. He has been named Úrvalsdeild karla Coach of the Year twice: in the 2006–07 season and in the 2008–09 season. In both seasons, he won the Icelandic men's championship KR. He has been named the Úrvalsdeild kvenna Coach of the year twice; in 2010, when he also won the Icelandic women's championship with KR, and in 2019.

== Coaching career ==
After coaching Þór Þorlákshöfn from 2010, Benedikt took over Þór Akureyri men's and women's teams in 2015. He led the men's team to victory in Division I in 2016 and a promotion to Úrvalsdeild karla. He led the women's team to victory in Division I in 2017 but the team failed to achieve promotion til the Úrvalsdeild kvenna after losing to Breiðablik in the promotion playoffs.

In May 2017, Benedikt was hired as the head coach of KR women's team.

After guiding KR to the Úrvalsdeild playoffs in 2019, Benedikt was named the Úrvalsdeild kvenna Coach of the Year. On 11 May 2020, he announced he was leaving KR.

On 30 May 2021, Benedikt was hired as the head coach of Úrvalsdeild karla club Njarðvík. On 18 September he guided Njarðvík to a 97–93 win against Stjarnan in the Icelandic Cup final, ending the clubs 16 year major title draught. He led Njarðvík to the best record in the Úrvalsdeild, becoming the first coach to lead three different clubs to the leagues best record. He left Njarðvík at the conclusion of his contract following the team's loss against Valur in the Úrvalsdeild semi-finals in May 2024.

In end of May 2024, Benedikt was hires as the head coach of Tindastóll. He led Tindastóll to the best record in the league and to the Úrvalsdeild finals where they lost to Stjarnan 2-3. After the season, he stepped down as head coach.

== Awards, titles and accomplishments ==
=== Individual awards ===
- Úrvalsdeild karla Coach of the year (2): 2005, 2009
- Úrvalsdeild kvenna Coach of the year (2): 2010, 2019
- Icelandic Women's D1 Coach of the year : 2018

=== Titles ===
==== Men's leagues ====
- Icelandic champion (2): 2007, 2009
- Icelandic Division I (2): 2011, 2016
- Icelandic Cup (2): 1998, 2021
- Icelandic Super Cup: 2007
- Icelandic Company Cup: 2008

==== Women's leagues ====
- Icelandic champion: 2010
- Icelandic Division I: 2017, 2018
- Icelandic Super Cup: 2009
- Icelandic Company Cup: 2009
