= Friðrik Ingi Rúnarsson =

Icelandic basketball coach and player

Personal information
- Born: 18 June 1968 (age 58)
- Listed height: 182 cm (6 ft 0 in)

Career information
- Playing career: 1984–1996
- Coaching career: 1988–2007; 2014–present

Career history

Playing
- 1984–1991: Njarðvík
- 1996: Grindavík

Coaching
- 1988–1990: Njarðvík (women's)
- 1990–1992: Njarðvík (men's)
- 1992–1993: KR (men's)
- 1994–1997: Grindavík (men's)
- 1995–1996: Grindavík (women's)
- 1997–2000: Njarðvík (men's)
- 1999–2003: Iceland (men's)
- 2001–2004: Grindavík (men's)
- 2005–2006: Grindavík (men's)
- 2006–2007: Iceland (men's, assistant)
- 2014–2016: Njarðvík (men's)
- 2017–2018: Keflavík (men's)
- 2019–2020: Þór Þorlákshöfn
- 2020–2021: Njarðvík (men's, assistant)
- 2021–2022: ÍR (men's)
- 2024: Keflavík (women's)
- 2025: Haukar (men's)

Career highlights
- As player: 3× Icelandic champion (1985–1987); 4× Icelandic Basketball Cup (1987–1990); As coach: 3× Icelandic champion (1991, 1996, 1998); 4× Icelandic Basketball Cup (1992, 1995, 1999, 2006); 2× Icelandic Basketball Supercup (1996, 1999); 3× Úrvalsdeild Men's Coach of the Year (1991, 1992, 1999)

Friðrik Ingi Rúnarsson is an Icelandic basketball coach and former player. As a coach, he has won three Icelandic men's championships and has guided his team to the Icelandic national finals a record seven times. Friðrik was the general manager of the Icelandic Basketball Association from 2006 to 2014 and coached the Icelandic men's national basketball team from 1999 to 2003.

== Playing career ==
Friðrik averaged 5.4 points over eight seasons in the Icelandic Úrvalsdeild with his best season coming in 1988-1989 when he averaged 12.9 points for Njarðvík.

== Coaching career ==
In 1990, at the age of 22, Friðrik was hired as the head coach of Njarðvík. He led the club to the national championship during his first season at the helm, beating arch-rivals Keflavík in the Úrvalsdeild finals.

In February 2017, he was hired as the head coach of Keflavík.

On 28 March 2018, after his Keflavík team lost in the first round against Haukar, Friðrik announced that he would be retiring from coaching.

In May 2019, Friðrik came out of retirement and took over as head coach of Þór Þorlákshöfn. He left the club in end of March 2020 after the season had been canceled due to the coronavirus outbreak in Iceland.

On 26 May 2020, Friðrik was hired as an assistant coach to Njarðvík men's team.

On 8 November 2021, Friðrik was hired as the head coach of ÍR men's team, following the departure of Borce Ilievski after the teams 1–4 start in the Úrvalsdeild. The team went 7–10 the rest of the way, finishing in 10th place. Following the season, Friðrik announced his retirement from coaching.

In June 2024, Friðrik returned to coaching after a two year hiatus and signed with reigning Úrvalsdeild kvenna champions Keflavík. On 16 December, Friðrik resigned from his post.

In January 2025, he was introduces as the new head coach of Úrvalsdeild karla club Haukar. He left the club at the end of the season.
