= 2020–21 Icelandic Men's Basketball Cup =

Basketball competition in Iceland

2020–2021 Bikarkeppni Karla
Tournament details
- Arena: Smárinn (Final); Kópavogur, Iceland
- Dates: 29 August – 18 September 2021

Final positions
- Champions: Njarðvík
- Runners-up: Stjarnan

Awards and statistics
- MVP: (United States) Dedrick Basile

The 2020–2021 Bikarkeppni karla, named Vís bikarinn for sponsorship reasons, was the 55th edition of the Icelandic Men's Basketball Cup, won by Njarðvík against Stjarnan. The competition was managed by the Icelandic Basketball Association (KKÍ) and the cup final was played in Smárinn, Kópavogur, and broadcast live on RÚV. Dedrick Basile was named the Cup Finals MVP after turning in 24 points and 7 assists.

== Participating teams ==
Initially twenty-five teams signed up for the Cup tournament. In October 2020, the tournament was postponed, first for two weeks and later indefinitely due to another Coronavirus outbreak in Iceland. On 28 January 2021, KKÍ announced that the competition would begin on 22 April and end on 1 May, featuring 16 teams and would be sponsored by the insurance company VÍS. It was later postponed to August 2021 with the first game played on 28 August.

== Bracket ==
Quarterfinals
12 September
Stjarnan	92
Grindavík	81
12 September
Njarðvík	93
Haukar	61
12 September
Sindri	66
ÍR	91
12 September
Tindastóll	84
Keflavík	67

Semifinals
16 September
Njarðvík	109
ÍR	87
16 September
Stjarnan	86
Tindastóll	81

Final
18 September
Stjarnan	93
Njarðvík	97

== Cup Finals MVP ==
Pos.	Player	Team
Point guard	(United States) Dedrick Basile	Njarðvík
