= Friðrik Ragnarsson =

Icelandic basketball player (born 1970)

Personal information
- Born: May 23, 1970 (age 56)

Career information
- Playing career: 1986–2001
- Position: Point guard
- Number: 9
- Coaching career: 2000–2012

Career history

Playing
- 1986–1992: Njarðvík
- 1992–1993: KR
- 1996–2001: Njarðvík
- 1999: ÍRB

Coaching
- 2000–2004: Njarðvík
- 2006–2010: Grindavík
- 2011–2012: Njarðvík

Career highlights
- As player: Úrvalsdeild Domestic All-First team (1999); 6x Icelandic champion (1987, 1991, 1994, 1995, 1998, 2001); 6× Icelandic Basketball Cup (1987–1990, 1992, 1999); 2× Icelandic Supercup (1995, 1999); As coach: 2x Icelandic champion (2001, 2002); Icelandic Basketball Cup (2002); 2x Icelandic Supercup (2001, 2002)

Career Úrvalsdeild karla playing statistics
- Points: 3,161 (9.6 ppg)
- Games: 328

Career coaching record
- Úrvalsdeild karla: 137–71 (.659)

Friðrik Pétur Ragnarsson (born 9 January 1967) is an Icelandic former basketball player and a coach.

== Playing career ==
Friðrik spent the majority of his career with Njarðvík, where he won the Icelandic national championships 6 times. He retired as a player after the 2001 Úrvalsdeild finals.

== Coaching career ==
Friðrik coached for nine seasons in the Úrvalsdeild karla, winning the national championship in 2001 and 2002.

== Icelandic national team ==
Between 1989 and 1999, Friðrik played 31 games for the Icelandic national team.

== Executive career ==
Friðrik served as the chairman of Njarðvík's basketball department from 2017 to 2019.

== Personal life ==
Friðrik is the father of Icelandic national team member Elvar Már Friðriksson and Úrvalsdeild point guard Ragnar Helgi Friðriksson.

== Awards and honours ==
=== As player ===
==== Club ====
- 6x Icelandic League champion (1987, 1991, 1994, 1995, 1998, 2001)
- 6× Icelandic Basketball Cup (1987–1990, 1992, 1999)
- 2x Icelandic Supercup (1995, 1999)

==== Individual ====
- Úrvalsdeild Domestic All-First Team (1999)

=== As coach ===
- 2x Icelandic Men's League champion (2001, 2002)
- Icelandic Men's Basketball Cup (2002)
- 2x Icelandic Men's Supercup (2001, 2002)
- 2x Icelandic Men's Company Cup (2002, 2009)
