= Nacho Martín (basketball) =

Spanish basketball player

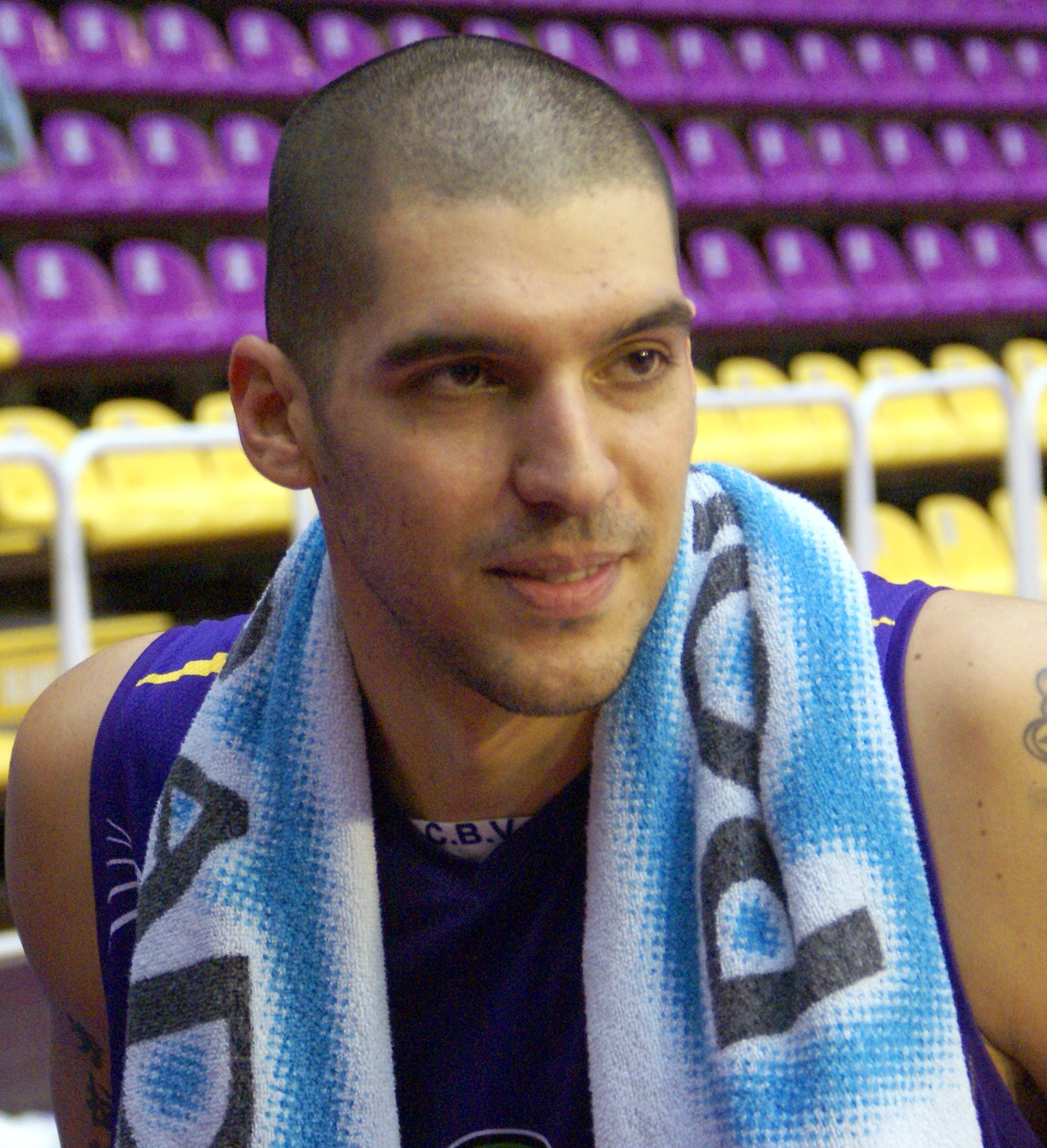
- Martín in 2011

Personal information
- Born: 22 April 1983 (age 43) Valladolid, Spain
- Listed height: 6 ft 8.75 in (2.05 m)
- Listed weight: 245 lb (111 kg)

Career information
- NBA draft: 2005: undrafted
- Playing career: 2001–present
- Position: Power forward / center

Career history
- 2001–2003: FC Barcelona B
- 2003: FC Barcelona
- 2003–2004: Círculo Badajoz
- 2004–2005: Calpe
- 2005–2006: Gipuzkoa Basket
- 2006–2009: Granada
- 2009–2010: Zaragoza
- 2010–2013: Valladolid
- 2013–2014: Gran Canaria
- 2014–2016: Estudiantes
- 2016–2017: Andorra
- 2018: Ciudad de Valladolid
- 2018: Manresa
- 2018–2019: Zaragoza
- 2019–2020: Real Betis
- 2020–2021: Real Valladolid
- 2021–2022: Estudiantes
- 2022: CB Cornella
- 2022–2023: Njarðvík
- 2023–present: Ibiza
Medals
Men's basketball
Representing Spain
FIBA Europe Under-20 Championship
| Silver medal – second place | 2002 Lithuania | National Team |
Men's 3x3 Basketball
Representing Spain
European Games
| Silver medal – second place | Baku 2015 | National Team |

José Ignacio "Nacho" Martín Monzón (born 22 April 1983) is a Spanish professional basketball player. He is a 6 ft. 8.75 in. (2.05 m) tall power forward-center. His nickname is DaFlow. His father, Morti Martín, was also a professional basketball player.

== Professional career ==
In his pro career, Martín has played with the following clubs: FC Barcelona, Círculo Badajoz, Calpe, Gipuzkoa Basket, Granada, Zaragoza, Valladolid, and Gran Canaria. He signed with Gran Canaria in 2013.

Martín came back to his native city in January 2018, for playing with LEB Oro team Carramimbre CBC Valladolid, but just after only one game, on 13 January 2018 he agrees terms with ICL Manresa for playing until the end of the 2017–18 season.

On August 13, 2018, Martín signed a one-year deal with Tecnyconta Zaragoza of the Liga ACB. On July 31, 2019, Martín signed a one-year deal with Coosur Real Betis.

After starting the season with CB Cornella, Martín signed with Njarðvík of the Icelandic Úrvalsdeild karla in November 2022.

== Spain national team ==
With the junior national team of Spain, Martín won the silver medal at the 2002 FIBA Europe Under-20 Championship. He has played several friendly games with the senior Spain men's national basketball team. Martin has also played with National 3x3 team winning the silver medal at the 2015 European Games
