= Keflavík (men's basketball) =

Keflavík ÍF
- Nickname: Keflavíkurhraðlestin (The Keflavík Express)
- Leagues: Úrvalsdeild karla
- Founded: 1974
- History: ÍBK; 1974–1994; Keflavík; 1994–present
- Arena: TM Arena
- Capacity: 1,200
- Location: Reykjanesbær, Iceland
- Team colors: Dark blue and White
- Ownership: Kári Jónsson
- Championships: 9 Icelandic championships (1989, 1992, 1993, 1997, 1999, 2003, 2004, 2005, 2008)
- Icelandic Cup titles: 7 (1993, 1994, 1997, 2003, 2004, 2012, 2024)
- Website: keflavik.is
Home	Away

The Keflavík men's basketball team, commonly known as Keflavík, is the men's professional basketball department of Keflavík ÍF (Keflavík, íþrótta- og ungmennafélag), based in the town of Reykjanesbær in Iceland. They currently play in Úrvalsdeild karla.

== Rivalry with Njarðvík ==
Keflavík's biggest rivals are their closest neighbours, Njarðvík. The teams are both based in Reykjanesbær. Keflavík and Njarðvík were neighbouring towns but were merged in 1994 and formed Reykjanesbær. Their arenas are within one kilometre of each other. In the 2008–09 season the rivalry was intensified as the men's teams were coached by brothers, Sigurður Ingimundarson with Keflavík and Valur Ingimundarson with Njarðvík. At the end of that season Sigurður left his post as the team's coach and moved to a club in Sweden. He was replaced by former player Guðjón Skúlason. Just before the start of the 2009–10 season Sigurður became coach of Njarðvík, replacing his brother Valur.

== Arena ==
The club's home arena is nicknamed "The Slaughterhouse".

== Achievements ==
=== Titles ===
- Icelandic champions: (9):
  - 1989, 1992, 1993, 1997, 1999, 2003, 2004, 2005, 2008
- Icelandic Basketball Cup: (7):
  - 1993, 1994, 1997, 2003, 2004, 2012, 2024
- Super Cup: (4):
  - 1997, 2003, 2008, 2024
- Company Cup: (6):
  - 1996, 1997, 1998, 2002, 2006, 2013
- 1. deild karla: (2):
  - 1982, 1985
- 2. deild karla: (1):
  - 1978

== Notable players ==
Note: Flags indicate national team eligibility at FIBA-sanctioned events. Players may hold other non-FIBA nationalities not displayed.

Criteria

To appear in this section a player must have either:

- Set a club record or won an individual award while at the club
- Played at least one official international match for their national team at any time
- Played at least one official NBA match at any time.

- (United States) Michael Craion
- (United States) A. J. Moye
- (United States) Amin Stevens
- (Iceland) Albert Óskarsson
- (Iceland) Arnar Freyr Jónsson
- (Iceland) Axel Nikulásson
- (Iceland) Birgir Örn Birgisson
- (Iceland) Björn Víkingur Skúlason
- (Iceland) Brynjar Harðarson
- (Finland) Remu Raitanen
- (United States) Lenear Burns
- (United States) Calvin Davis
- (Slovenia) Jaka Brodnik
- (United Kingdom) Deane Williams
- (Iceland) Magnús Guðfinnsson
- (Iceland) Damon S. Johnson
- (Iceland) Darrel Lewis
- (Iceland) Falur Harðarson
- (Iceland) Fannar Ólafsson
- (Iceland) Guðjón Skúlason
- (Iceland) Gunnar Ólafsson
- (Iceland) Gylfi Þorkelsson
- (Iceland) Halldór Örn Halldórsson
- (Iceland) Hjörtur Harðarson
- (Iceland) Hörður Vilhjálmsson
- (Iceland) Jón Kr. Gíslason
- (Iceland) Jón Norðdal Hafsteinsson
- (Iceland) Jónatan James Bow
- (Iceland) Kevin Grandberg
- (Iceland) Kristinn Friðriksson
- (Iceland) Magnús Þór Gunnarsson
- (Iceland) Sigurður Þorsteinsson
- (Iceland) Sigurður Ingimundarson
- (Iceland) Sverrir Þór Sverrisson
- (Iceland) Viðar Vignisson
- (Iceland) Þorsteinn Bjarnason
- (Iceland) Þröstur Leó Jóhannsson

== Head coaches ==
- (United States) Tim Higgins 1982
- (Iceland) Sigurður Valgeirsson 1982
- (United States) Brad Miley 1982–1984
- (Iceland) Hreinn Þorkelsson 1985–1986
- (Iceland) Gunnar Þorvarðarson 1986–1988
- (United States) Lee Nober 1988–1989
- (Iceland) Jón Kr. Gíslason 1989
- (United States) John Veargason 1989
- (Iceland) Guðbrandur J. Stefánsson 1989
- (United States) Sandy Andersson 1989–1990
- (Iceland) Jón Kr. Gíslason 1990–1996
- (Iceland) Sigurður Ingimundarson 1996–2003
- (Iceland) Falur Harðarson and (Iceland) Guðjón Skúlason 2003–2004
- (Iceland) Sigurður Ingimundarson 2004–2009
- (Iceland) Guðjón Skúlason 2009–2011
- (Iceland) Sigurður Ingimundarson 2011–2013
- (United States) Andy Johnston 2013–2014
- (Iceland) Sigurður Ingimundarson 2014–2016
- (Iceland) Hjörtur Harðarson 2016–2017
- (Iceland) Friðrik Ingi Rúnarsson 2017–2018
- (Iceland) Sverrir Þór Sverrisson 2018–2019
- (Iceland) Hjalti Þór Vilhjálmsson 2019–2023
- (Iceland) Pétur Ingvarsson 2023–2025
- (Iceland) Magnús Þór Gunnarsson 2025 (interim)
- (Iceland) Sigurður Ingimundarson and (Iceland) Jón Halldór Eðvaldsson 2025
- (Iceland) Daníel Guðni Guðmundsson 2025–present

== Trivia ==
- The team has a reputation for playing an uptempo game which earned it the nickname Keflavíkurhraðlestin (The Keflavík Express).
