= Icelandic Men's Basketball Company Cup =

Icelandic basketball competition

- Sport: Basketball
- Founded: 1996 season
- Folded: 2015
- Country: Iceland
- Continent: (European Union) Europe
- Most titles: Keflavík (6 titles)
- Related competitions: Úrvalsdeild karla Icelandic Cup; Icelandic Supercup
- Website: KKI.is

The Icelandic Men's Basketball Company Cup, commonly known as the Men's Company Cup (Icelandic: Fyrirtækjabikar karla), was an annual basketball competition between clubs in Iceland that was organized by the Icelandic Basketball Federation. It was Iceland's second-tier cup competition, and is not to be confused with Iceland's first-tier cup competition, the Icelandic Cup.

== History and format ==
The Company Cup was founded in 1996 and its first edition, bearing the name Lengjubikarinn after its sponsor Lengjan, took place in October and November that year. It included all twelve Úrvalsdeild karla teams and the top four teams from the second-tier 1. deild karla. The first cup was won by Keflavík after it defeated KR in the Cup final, 101–107.

Its last edition to date was held in 2015 where Stjarnan defeated Þór Þorlákshöfn in the Cup finals, 72–58.

== Title holders ==
- 1996 Keflavík
- 1997 Keflavík
- 1998 Keflavík
- 1999 Tindastóll
- 2000 Grindavík
- 2001 Njarðvík
- 2002 Keflavík
- 2003 Njarðvík
- 2004 Snæfell
- 2005 Njarðvík
- 2006 Keflavík
- 2007 Snæfell
- 2008 KR
- 2009 Grindavík
- 2010 Snæfell
- 2011 Grindavík
- 2012 Tindastóll
- 2013 Keflavík
- 2014 KR
- 2015 Stjarnan

== See also ==
- Icelandic Basketball Federation
- Úrvalsdeild karla
- Icelandic Basketball Cup
- Icelandic Basketball Supercup
- Icelandic Division I
