= Njarðvík (men's basketball) =

Ungmennafélagið Njarðvík
- Leagues: Úrvalsdeild karla
- History: ÍKF (1952–1969); UMFN (1969–present)
- Arena: IceMar-Höllin
- Location: Reykjanesbær, Iceland
- Team colors: green, white
- President: Hafsteinn Sveinsson
- Head coach: Rúnar Ingi Erlingsson
- Assistant: Logi Gunnarsson
- Championships: 17 Icelandic championships
- Website: UMFN.is
Home	Away

The Njarðvík men's basketball team, commonly known as Njarðvík or UMFN, is the men's basketball department of Ungmennafélag Njarðvíkur, based in the town of Reykjanesbær in Iceland.

It is one of the most successful men's team in Icelandic basketball, winning 17 national championships. The team, then known as Íþróttafélag Keflavíkurflugvallar (ÍKF), was one of the founding members of the Icelandic top league in 1952 and won the first Icelandic men's championship that same year. In 1969 the team merged into Ungmennafélag Njarðvíkur and became its basketball department.

== Rivalries ==
=== Keflavík ===
The rivalry between the two teams from the neighbouring towns of Keflavík and Njarðvík began in earnest when Keflavík ÍF won its first national championship in 1989. From 1991 to 2010, the teams faced three times in the Úrvalsdeild finals and four times in the Icelandic Cup final.

== Colours ==
The original uniform colours of the club were blue and white. In late 1973 the basketball department was in need of new uniforms and due to lack of funds they decided to select a colour that no other team was using, so they wouldn't have to buy two sets of uniforms. There were three colours to choose from but as the three selectors were all Boston Celtics fans they decided to choose green uniforms. The green colour has been in use since then, except for the 1989-90 season when they played in the orange colour of its biggest sponsor, Hagkaup.

== Arena ==
After moving to Njarðvík, the team played its home games at Íþróttahús Njarðvíkur, commonly nicknamed Ljónagryfjan (English: The Lion's Den) In July 2019, Njarðvík signed a 2-year sponsorship deal with Njarðtak, naming the arena the Njarðtaks-gryfjan (English: The Njarðtak's Den). In 2024, the team into a new arena, named Stapaskóli.

== European record ==
Season	Competition	Round	Opponent	Home	Away	Aggregate
1976–77	FIBA European Cup Winners' Cup	1Q	(Scotland) Boroughmuir Barr	77–78	66–87	143–165
1989–90	FIBA European Cup Winners' Cup	1Q	(West Germany) Bayer 04 Leverkusen	81–112	74–104	155–216
1991–92	FIBA EuroLeague	2Q	(Croatia) KK Cibona	76–111	74–97	150–208

== Trophies and awards ==
=== Trophies ===
Úrvalsdeild karla

- Winners (17): 1952^{1}, 1953^{1}, 1956^{1}, 1958^{1}, 1981, 1982, 1984, 1985, 1986, 1987, 1991, 1994, 1995, 1998, 2001, 2002, 2006

Icelandic Basketball Cup

- Winners (9): 1987, 1988, 1989, 1990, 1992, 1999, 2002, 2005, 2021

Icelandic Super Cup

- Winners (7): 1995, 1999, 2001, 2002, 2004, 2005, 2006

Company Cup

- Winners (3): 2001, 2003, 2005

Division I

- Winners (3): 1965^{1}, 1969^{1}, 1972
1. As ÍKF

=== Individual awards ===
- Icelandic Cup Finals MVP
  - Jóhannes Kristbjörnsson – 1987

== Notable players ==
Note: Flags indicate national team eligibility at FIBA-sanctioned events. Players may hold other non-FIBA nationalities not displayed.

Criteria

To appear in this section a player must have either:

- Set a club record or won an individual award while at the club
- Played at least one official international match for their national team at any time
- Played at least one official NBA match at any time.

- (Iceland) (United States) Brenton Birmingham
- (United States) Danny Shouse
- (United States) Dedrick Basile
- (Iceland) Egill Jónasson
- (Iceland) Elvar Már Friðriksson
- (Central African Republic) Evans Ganapamo
- (Iceland) Friðrik Ragnarsson
- (Iceland) Friðrik Erlendur Stefánsson
- (Iceland) Gunnar Þorvarðarson
- (Iceland) Haukur Pálsson
- (Iceland) Hermann Hauksson
- (Iceland) Hörður Axel Vilhjálmsson
- (Iceland) Ísak Tómasson
- (Iceland) Kári Marísson
- (Iceland) Kristinn Pálsson
- (Iceland) Logi Gunnarsson
- (Iceland) Magnús Þór Gunnarsson
- (Spain) Nacho Martín
- (Iceland) Örlygur Aron Sturluson
- (Iran) Philip Jalalpoor
- (Iceland) Ragnar Nathanaelsson
- (United States) Rondey Robinson
- (Iceland) Teitur Örlygsson
- (Malta) Tevin Falzon
- (Iceland) Valur Ingimundarson

== Head coaches ==
- (United States) Gene Crowley and James H. Wahl 1952
- (Iceland) Guðmundur Þorsteinsson 1971
- (Iceland) Hilmar Hafsteinsson 1978–1979
- (United States) Theodore Bee 1979–1980
- (United States) Danny Shouse 1980–1981
- (Iceland) Hilmar Hafsteinsson 1981–1982
- (United States) Alex Gilbert 1982
- (Iceland) Gunnar Þorvarðarson 1982
- (United States) Bill Kotterman 1982–1983
- (Iceland) Gunnar Þorvarðarson 1983–1986
- (Iceland) Valur Ingimundarson 1986–1988
- (United States) Chris Fadness 1988–1989
- (Iceland) Gunnar Þorvarðarson 1989
- (Iceland) Árni Lárusson 1989–1990
- (Iceland) Friðrik Ingi Rúnarsson 1990–1992
- (United States) Paul Colton 1992
- (Iceland) Teitur Örlygsson 1992–1993
- (Iceland) Valur Ingimundarson 1993–1995
- (Iceland) Hrannar Hólm 1995–1996
- (Iceland) Ástþór Ingason 1997
- (Iceland) Friðrik Ingi Rúnarsson 1997–2000
- (Iceland) Friðrik Ragnarsson and
  (Iceland) Teitur Örlygsson 2000–2001
- (Iceland) Friðrik Ragnarsson 2001–2004
- (Iceland) Einar Árni Jóhannsson 2004–2007
- (Iceland) Teitur Örlygsson 2007–2008
- (Iceland) Valur Ingimundarson 2008–2009
- (Iceland) Sigurður Ingimundarson 2009–2011
- (Iceland) Einar Árni Jóhannsson and
  (Iceland) Friðrik Ragnarsson 2011–2012
- (Iceland) Einar Árni Jóhannsson 2012–2014
- (Iceland) Friðrik Ingi Rúnarsson 2014–2016
- (Iceland) Daníel Guðni Guðmundsson 2016–2018
- (Iceland) Einar Árni Jóhannsson 2018–2021
- (Iceland) Benedikt Guðmundsson 2021–2024
- (Iceland) Rúnar Ingi Erlingsson 2024–present

== Reserve team ==
Njarðvík's reserve team, called Njarðvík-b, regularly plays in the Icelandic 3rd-tier 2. deild karla.
