= Grindavík (men's basketball) =

Ungmennafélag Grindavíkur
- Leagues: Úrvalsdeild karla
- History: Grindavík (1972–present)
- Arena: Röstin
- Location: Grindavík, Iceland
- Team colors: Yellow, blue, white
- Head coach: Jóhann Þór Ólafsson
- Assistant: Lárus Jónsson
- Championships: 4 Úrvalsdeild karla
- Website: UMFG.is
Home	Away

The Grindavík men's basketball team, commonly known as Grindavík or UMFG for short, is the men's team of the basketball department of Ungmennafélag Grindavíkur multi-sport club, based in the town of Grindavík in Iceland. It has won four national championships, in 1996, 2012, 2013 and 2026.

== Recent history ==
In February 2020, Grindavík went to the Icelandic Cup Finals where it lost to Stjarnan.

On 18 May 2026, Grindavík won its fourth national championship after defeating Tindastóll, 3-1, in the Úrvalsdeild finals.

== Honors ==
Úrvalsdeild

- Winners (4): 1996, 2012, 2013, 2026

Icelandic Basketball Cup

- Winners (5): 1995, 1998, 2000, 2006, 2014

Company Cup

- Winners (3): 2000, 2009, 2011

== Notable players ==
Note: Flags indicate national team eligibility at FIBA-sanctioned events. Players may hold other non-FIBA nationalities not displayed.

Criteria

To appear in this section a player must have either:

- Set a club record or won an individual award while at the club
- Played at least one official international match for their national team at any time
- Played at least one official NBA match at any time.

- (Soviet Union) (Iceland) Alexander Ermolinskij
- (Iceland) Arnar Freyr Jónsson
- (Iceland) Axel Nikulásson
- (Iceland) Brenton Birmingham
- (Iceland) Dagur Kár Jónsson
- (Iceland) Darrel Lewis
- (Iceland) Guðjón Skúlason
- (Iceland) Guðmundur Bragason
- (Iceland) Helgi Jónas Guðfinnsson
- (Iceland) Herbert Arnarson
- (United States) J'Nathan Bullock
- (Nigeria) Jamal Olasewere
- (United States) Jeremy Pargo
- (Trinidad and Tobago) Joey Haywood
- (Estonia) Joonas Järveläinen
- (Iceland) Jón Axel Guðmundsson
- (Iceland) Jón Kr. Gíslason
- (Greece) Kostas Tsartsaris
- (Iceland) Kristinn Friðriksson
- (Iceland) Kristinn Pálsson
- (Iceland) Magnús Þór Gunnarsson
- (United States) Nick Bradford
- (Iceland) Ólafur Ólafsson
- (Iceland) Páll Axel Vilbergsson
- (Iceland) Pálmar Sigurðsson
- (Iceland) Sigtryggur Arnar Björnsson
- (Iceland) Sigurður Þorsteinsson
- (Ivory Coast) Tiegbe Bamba
- (Lithuania) Valdas Vasylius

== Head coaches ==
Managers since 1987:

- Brad Casey 1987–1988
- Douglas Harvey 1988–1989
- Dennis Matika 1989–1990
- Gunnar Þorvarðarson 1990–1992
- Dan Krebbs 1992
- Pálmar Sigurðsson 1992–1993
- Guðmundur Bragason 1993–1994
- Friðrik Ingi Rúnarsson 1994–1997
- Benedikt Guðmundsson 1997–1998
- Guðmundur Bragason 1998
- Einar Einarsson 1999–2001
- Friðrik Ingi Rúnarsson 2001–2004
- Kristinn Friðriksson 2004
- Einar Einarsson 2005
- Friðrik Ingi Rúnarsson 2005–2006
- Friðrik Ragnarsson 2006–2010
- Helgi Jónas Guðfinnsson 2010–2012
- Sverrir Þór Sverrisson 2012–2015
- Jóhann Þór Ólafsson 2015–2019
- Daníel Guðni Guðmundsson 2019–2022
- Sverrir Þór Sverrisson 2022
- Jóhann Þór Ólafsson 2022–present

== European record ==
Season	Competition	Round	Opponent	Home	Away	Aggregate
1994–95	FIBA Korać Cup	1Q	(Sweden) Borås Basket	96–108	105–97	201–205
