= Icelandic Men's Basketball Supercup =

Icelandic Basketball Supercup
- Sport: Basketball
- Founded: 1995
- No. of teams: 2
- Country: Iceland
- Confederation: FIBA Europe
- Most recent champions: Keflavík (4th title)
- Most titles: Njarðvík (8 titles)
- Broadcaster: Stöð 2 Sport
- Related competitions: Úrvalsdeild karla Icelandic Cup
- Website: KKI.is

The Icelandic Men's Basketball Supercup (Icelandic: Meistarakeppni karla) is a professional basketball super cup competition that opposes the latest winners of the Úrvalsdeild – the top-tier Icelandic national men's domestic league – and the winners of the Icelandic Basketball Cup, the top-tier national men's cup competition in Iceland. Created in 1995, it is organised by the Icelandic Basketball Federation – who run the Úrvalsdeild and the Icelandic Cup, and it traditionally opens the season.

== Title holders ==
Njarðvík are the record-holders with eight cups.

- 1995 Njarðvík
- 1996 Grindavík
- 1997 Keflavík
- 1998 Grindavík
- 1999 Njarðvík
- 2000 KR
- 2001 Njarðvík
- 2002 Njarðvík
- 2003 Keflavík
- 2004 Njarðvík
- 2005 Njarðvík
- 2006 Njarðvík
- 2007 KR
- 2008 Keflavík
- 2009 Stjarnan
- 2010 Snæfell
- 2011 Grindavík
- 2012 Grindavík
- 2013 Grindavík
- 2014 KR
- 2015 KR
- 2016 Þór Þorlákshöfn
- 2017 Þór Þorlákshöfn
- 2018 Tindastóll
- 2019 Stjarnan
- 2020 Stjarnan
- 2021 Þór Þorlákshöfn
- 2022 Valur
- 2023 Valur
- 2024 Keflavík

== See also ==
- Úrvalsdeild karla
- Icelandic Men's Basketball Cup
- Icelandic Basketball Federation
