= Icelandic Men's Basketball Cup =

Sporting competition

- Current season, competition or edition: 2024–25 Icelandic Men's Basketball Cup
- Sport: Basketball
- Founded: 1965 season
- Country: Iceland
- Continent: (European Union) Europe
- Most recent champions: KR (15th title)
- Most titles: KR (15 titles)
- Broadcaster: RÚV
- Sponsor: Vátryggingarfélag Íslands (VÍS)
- Related competitions: Úrvalsdeild karla Icelandic Supercup
- Website: KKI.is

The Icelandic Men's Basketball Cup (Icelandic: Bikarkeppni KKÍ), also known as VÍS bikarinn for sponsorship reasons, is an annual professional basketball competition between clubs in Iceland. It is Iceland's first-tier cup competition, and is not to be confused with Iceland's former second-tier cup competition, the Company Cup.

== History and format ==
The first edition of the Icelandic Cup championship took place in 1965, and was won by Ármann. In 1968 and 1969, the cup competition was not held, but it has been held regularly every year from 1970 onward. Teams in Úrvalsdeild karla and Division I have an automatic bye to the Final 32 while lower league teams might have to play preliminary rounds for a place, depending on the number of teams. All the rounds are played with a single game knockout format. The final four and the finals are played on a single weekend.

Finally, the winner of the Icelandic Cup championship, or the runner-up if the same team wins both the cup and national championship, will then face the winner of the Úrvalsdeild karla championship in a single game to determine the winner of the Icelandic Supercup championship in the beginning of the next season.

== Title holders ==
- 1965 Ármann
- 1966 KR
- 1967 KR
- 1968 Not Held
- 1969 Not Held
- 1970 KR
- 1971 KR
- 1972 KR
- 1973 KR
- 1973–74 KR
- 1974–75 Ármann
- 1975–76 Ármann
- 1976–77 KR
- 1977–78 ÍS
- 1978–79 KR
- 1979–80 Valur
- 1980–81 Valur
- 1981–82 Fram
- 1982–83 Valur
- 1983–84 KR
- 1984–85 Haukar
- 1985–86 Haukar
- 1986–87 Njarðvík
- 1987–88 Njarðvík
- 1988–89 Njarðvík
- 1989–90 Njarðvík
- 1990–91 KR
- 1991–92 Njarðvík
- 1992–93 Keflavík
- 1993–94 Keflavík
- 1994–95 Grindavík
- 1995–96 Haukar
- 1996–97 Keflavík
- 1997–98 Grindavík
- 1998–99 Njarðvík
- 1999–00 Grindavík
- 2000–01 ÍR
- 2001–02 Njarðvík
- 2002–03 Keflavík
- 2003–04 Keflavík
- 2004–05 Njarðvík
- 2005–06 Grindavík
- 2006–07 ÍR
- 2007–08 Snæfell
- 2008–09 Stjarnan
- 2009–10 Snæfell
- 2010–11 KR
- 2011–12 Keflavík
- 2012–13 Stjarnan
- 2013–14 Grindavík
- 2014–15 Stjarnan
- 2015–16 KR
- 2016–17 KR
- 2017–18 Tindastóll
- 2018–19 Stjarnan
- 2019–20 Stjarnan
- 2020–21 Njarðvík
- 2021–22 Stjarnan
- 2022–23 Valur
- 2023–24 Keflavík
- 2024–25 Valur

== Cup Finals MVP ==
- 1987 (Iceland) Jóhannes Kristbjörnsson (Njarðvík)
- 2010 (United States) Sean Burton (Snæfell)
- 2011 (Iceland) Pavel Ermolinskij (KR)
- 2012 (United States) Charles Parker (Keflavík)
- 2013 (United States) Jarrid Frye (Stjarnan)
- 2014 (Iceland) Sigurður Þorsteinsson (Grindavík)
- 2015 (Iceland) Justin Shouse (Stjarnan)
- 2016 (Iceland) Helgi Már Magnússon (KR)
- 2017 (Iceland) Jón Arnór Stefánsson (KR)
- 2018 (Iceland) Pétur Rúnar Birgisson (Tindastóll)
- 2019 (United States) Brandon Rozzell (Stjarnan)
- 2020 (Iceland) Ægir Steinarsson (Stjarnan)
- 2021 (United States) Dedrick Basile (Njarðvík)
- 2022 (Slovakia) David Gabrovšek (Stjarnan)
- 2023 (Iceland) Kári Jónsson (Valur)
- 2023 (Slovenia) Jaka Brodnik (Keflavík)
- 2024 ?
- 2025 (Republic of Ireland) Taiwo Badmus (Valur)

== See also ==
- Icelandic Basketball Federation
- Úrvalsdeild karla
- Icelandic Basketball Supercup
- Icelandic Division I
