= Úrvalsdeild Men's Young Player of the Year =

Icelandic basketball award

The Men's Young Player of the Year is an annual Úrvalsdeild honor bestowed on the best young player in the league following every season. The winner receives the Örlygur Cup, named after Örlygur Aron Sturluson.

== All-time award winners ==
The following is a list of the all-time Úrvalsdeild Men's Young Player of the Year winners.

Season	Player	Team
1983-1984	(Iceland) Guðni Ólafur Guðnason	KR
1984-1985		
1985-1986	(Iceland) Jóhannes Kristbjörnsson	Njarðvík
1986-1987	(Iceland) Falur Harðarson	Keflavík
1987-1988	(Iceland) Magnús Guðfinnsson	Keflavík
1988-1989	(Iceland) Jón Arnar Ingvarsson	Haukar
1989-1990	(Iceland) Marel Örn Guðlaugsson	Grindavík
1990-1991	(Iceland) Magnús Matthíasson	Valur
1991-1992	(Iceland) Óskar Kristjánsson	KR
1992-1993	(Iceland) Helgi Jónas Guðfinnsson	Grindavík
1993-1994	(Iceland) Sverrir Þór Sverrisson	Snæfell
1994-1995	(Iceland) Herbert Arnarson	ÍR
1995-1996	(Iceland) Bjarni Magnússon	ÍA
1996-1997	(Iceland) Friðrik Erlendur Stefánsson	KFÍ
1997-1998	(Iceland) Baldur Ólafsson	KR
1998-1999	(Iceland) Hlynur Bæringsson	Skallagrímur
1999-2000	(Iceland) Ægir Hrafn Jónsson	ÍA
2000-2001	(Iceland) Jón Arnór Stefánsson	KR
2001-2002	(Iceland) Helgi Már Magnússon	KR
2002-2003	(Iceland) Sævar Ingi Haraldsson	Haukar
2003-2004	(Iceland) Sævar Ingi Haraldsson (2x)	Haukar
2004-2005	(Iceland) Brynjar Þór Björnsson	KR
2005-2006	(Iceland) Hörður Axel Vilhjálmsson	Fjölnir
2006-2007	(Iceland) Jóhann Árni Ólafsson	Njarðvík
2007-2008	(Iceland) Sigurður Gunnar Þorsteinsson	Keflavík
2008-2009	(Iceland) Rúnar Ingi Erlingsson	Breiðablik
2009-2010	(Iceland) Ægir Þór Steinarsson	Fjölnir
2010-2011	(Iceland) Ægir Þór Steinarsson (2x)	Fjölnir
2011-2012	(Iceland) Elvar Már Friðriksson	Njarðvík
2012-2013	(Iceland) Elvar Már Friðriksson (2x)	Njarðvík
2013-2014	(Iceland) Martin Hermannsson	KR
2014-2015	(Iceland) Pétur Rúnar Birgisson	Tindastóll
2015-2016	(Iceland) Kári Jónsson	Haukar
2016-2017	(Iceland) Þórir Guðmundur Þorbjarnarson	KR
2017-2018	(Iceland) Ingvi Þór Guðmundsson	Grindavík
2018-2019	(Iceland) Hilmar Smári Henningsson	Haukar
2020-2021	(Iceland) Styrmir Snær Þrastarson	Þór Þorlákshöfn
2021-2022	(Iceland) Þorvaldur Orri Árnason	KR
2022-2023	(Iceland) Tómas Valur Þrastarson	Þór Þorlákshöfn
2023-2024	(Iceland) Tómas Valur Þrastarson (2x)	Þór Þorlákshöfn
2024-2025	(Iceland) Hilmir Arnarsson	Haukar
2025-2026	(Iceland) Styrmir Jónasson	ÍA
