= 2019–20 Úrvalsdeild karla (basketball) =

Domino's deild karla^{1}
- Duration: 3 October 2019 – 18 March 2020
- Games played: 126
- Teams: 12
- TV partner: Stöð 2 Sport

Regular season
- Top seed: Stjarnan
- Relegated: Fjölnir

Statistical leaders
Points	(United States) Viktor Lee Moses	22.6
Rebounds	(Lithuania) Dominykas Milka	12.1
Assists	(Iceland) Hörður Vilhjálmsson	9.0

Records
- Biggest home win: Njarðvík 113–52 Þór Akureyri (15 November 2019)
- Biggest away win: Keflavík 118–73 Fjölnir (5 March 2020)
- Highest scoring: ÍR 120–113 Þór Akureyri (24 January 2020)
- Winning streak: 13 games Stjarnan
- Losing streak: 16 games Fjölnir
- All statistics correct as of 18 March 2020.^{1} Sponsored league name, referring to Úrvalsdeild karla.

The 2019–20 Úrvalsdeild karla was the 69th season of the Úrvalsdeild karla, the top tier men's basketball league in Iceland. The season started on 3 October 2019. On 13 March 2020, with each team having one game left, the season was postponed for at least four weeks due to the coronavirus pandemic in the country. On 18 March, the rest of the season was canceled. Fjölnir was relegated and Stjarnan was named divisional champions for having the best record at the time of the cancelation but no national champions would be named for the season.

== Competition format ==
The participating teams first played a conventional round-robin schedule with every team playing each opponent once home and once away for a total of 22 games. The top eight teams qualified for the championship playoffs whilst the two last qualified were relegated to Division 1.

== Teams ==
Team	City, Region	Arena	Head coach
Fjölnir	Grafarvogur	Dalhús	(Iceland) Falur Harðarson
Grindavík	Grindavík	Mustad Höllin	(Iceland) Daníel Guðni Guðmundsson
Haukar	Hafnarfjörður	Schenkerhöllin	(Iceland) Israel Martín
ÍR	Reykjavík	Hertz Hellirinn	(North Macedonia) Borce Ilievski
Keflavík	Keflavík	TM Höllin	(Iceland) Hjalti Þór Vilhjálmsson
KR	Reykjavík	DHL Höllin	(Iceland) Ingi Þór Steinþórsson
Njarðvík	Njarðvík	Ljónagryfjan	(Iceland) Einar Árni Jóhannsson
Stjarnan	Garðabær	Ásgarður	(Iceland) Arnar Guðjónsson
Tindastóll	Sauðárkrókur	Sauðárkrókur	(Iceland) Baldur Þór Ragnarsson
Valur	Reykjavík	Origo-höllin	(Iceland) Finnur Freyr Stefánsson
Þór Akureyri	Akureyri	Höllin	(Iceland) Lárus Jónsson
Þór Þorlákshöfn	Þorlákshöfn	Icelandic Glacial Höllin	(Iceland) Friðrik Ingi Rúnarsson

=== Managerial changes ===
Team	Outgoing manager	Manner of departure	Date of vacancy	Position in table	Replaced with	Date of appointment
Haukar	(Iceland) Ívar Ásgrímsson	End of contract	14 March 2019	Off-season	(Spain) Israel Martín	15 May 2019
Grindavík	(Iceland) Jóhann Þór Ólafsson	End of contract	29 March 2019	Off-season	(Iceland) Daníel Guðni Guðmundsson	12 May 2019
Tindastóll	(Spain) Israel Martín	Resigned	15 April 2019	Off-season	(Iceland) Baldur Þór Ragnarsson	8 May 2019
Þór Þorlákshöfn	(Iceland) Baldur Þór Ragnarsson	Resigned	8 May 2019	Off-season	(Iceland) Friðrik Ingi Rúnarsson	12 May 2019
Þór Þorlákshöfn	(Iceland) Sverrir Þór Sverrisson	Resigned	21 May 2019	Off-season	(Iceland) Hjalti Þór Vilhjálmsson	21 May 2019

== Regular season ==
=== Standings ===
Pos	Team	Pld	W	L	PF	PA	PD	Pts	Qualification or relegation
1	Stjarnan (Note: As the playoffs where canceled, no team won the national championship. The team with the best record in the league receives the title Division champions (Icelandic: Deildarmeistarar). Stjarnan received the title as it had the best record at the time of cancelation.)	21	17	4	1915	1743	+172	34	Division champions
2	Keflavík	21	16	5	1880	1675	+205	32	
3	Tindastóll	21	14	7	1829	1727	+102	28	
4	KR	21	14	7	1807	1742	+65	28	
5	Njarðvík	21	13	8	1838	1644	+194	26	
6	Haukar	21	11	10	1834	1799	+35	22	
7	ÍR	21	11	10	1782	1883	−101	22	
8	Grindavík	21	8	13	1784	1839	−55	16	
9	Þór Þorlákshöfn	21	7	14	1667	1753	−86	14	
10	Valur	21	7	14	1698	1812	−114	14	
11	Þór Akureyri	21	6	15	1808	1997	−189	12	
12	Fjölnir	21	2	19	1754	1982	−228	4	Relegated to Division 1

Updated to match(es) played on 13 March 2020. Source: KKÍ

=== Results ===
Home \ Away	FJO	GRI	HAU	IR	KEF	KR	NJA	STJ	TIN	VAL	THA	THO
Fjölnir	—	91–92	83–94	81–82	73–118	80–99	81–88		88–100	87–94	93–94	83–91
Grindavík	91–75	—	73–88	82–90	89–97	91–94	78–66	83–95		85–69	100–94	95–78
Haukar	99–75	97–93	—	101–82	86–70	83–75	76–87	86–106	76–79		105–84	92–86
ÍR	92–80	90–92	93–100	—		78–77	72–85	75–93	92–84	99–90	120–113	90–85
Keflavík	109–98	80–60	80–69	93–70	—	66–67	88–84	77–83	95–84	92–82	97–89	78–63
KR	96–83	89–77	102–84	120–92	88–82	—	75–78	79–77	85–92	87–76		78–75
Njarðvík	117–83	101–75	89–75	88–64	85–97	81–87	—	76–78	75–83	86–76	113–52	101–77
Stjarnan	95–88	99–85	94–83	103–74	91–103	110–67	89–84	—	73–66	83–79	107–86	84–70
Tindastóll	80–81	106–88	89–77	99–76	77–86	80–76	91–80	93–81	—	89–91	89–77	72–67
Valur	92–75	68–90	78–94	75–85	68–96	81–90	53–77	108–78	95–92	—	79–88	87–73
Þór Akureyri	69–94	89–86	92–89	75–85	80–95	102–100	94–97	101–104	86–96	79–87	—	83–76
Þór Þorl	90–82	83–79	89–80	67–81	89–81	74–76		80–92	82–88	87–70	85–81	—

Updated to match(es) played on 13 March 2020. Source: KKÍ
Legend: Blue = home team win; Red = away team win.

== Notable occurrences ==
- On May 11, the board of Þór Þorlákshöfn wrote and open letter to the Icelandic Basketball Association, denouncing Tindastóll's act of offering Baldur Þór Ragnarsson their head coaching position while he was still under contract with Þór.
- On May 11, it was reported that Jaka Brodnik would follow his former Þór Þorlákshöfn coach north and sign with Tindastóll.
- On May 15, it was reported that Keflavík owed the Icelandic Basketball Association 3 million ISK in unpaid transfer and referee fees and would lose their spot in the Úrvalsdeild if the debt would not be paid by May 30.
- On 29 May, KR signed the team's all-time leading scorer and former captain Brynjar Þór Björnsson, who had spent the previous season with Tindastóll, and brothers Matthías Orri Sigurðarson and Jakob Sigurðarson.
- On June 5, it was reported that Keflavík had signed former Augusta University player Deane Williams.
- On June 23, Njarðvík signed Evaldas Žabas.
- On June 26, Þór Akureyri signed Colombian national team player Hansel Atencia.
- On July 5, Njarðvík signed a 2-year sponsorship deal with Njarðtak, naming their home arena the Njarðtaks-gryfjan (English: The Njarðtak's Den).
- On July 7, Tindastóll signed former EuroLeague player Jasmin Perković.
- On July 8, Stjarnan signed former Olympian and British national basketball team player Kyle Johnson.
- On July 10, it was reported that Icelandic national team player, Collin Pryor, had left Stjarnan after spending the last two seasons with the team.
- On July 18, Haukar signed former Úrvalsdeild scoring champion Flenard Whitfield. He previously played with Skallagrímur during the 2016–17 season.
- On July 22, Stjarnan signed former Þór Þorlákshöfn star player, Nikolas Tomsick.
- On July 26, it was reported that Icelandic national team player Gunnar Ólafsson had terminated his contract with Keflavík. He was a key player for Keflavík the previous season, averaging 14.1 points and 3.9 rebounds per game.
- On August 13, Valur signed 7-times national champion and Icelandic national team player Pavel Ermolinskij.
- On August 20, it was reported that ÍR had signed Swiss national team member Roberto Kovac. Shortly later, it was revealed that he had also signed with Croatian club KK Cibona without ÍR's approval. In September, Cibona bought up Kovac's contract við ÍR before he played any games for the team.
- On August 22, Grindavík signed Nigerian national team player Jamal Olasewere.
- On August 24, ÍR signed Icelandic national team member Collin Pryor who had spent the previous seasons with Stjarnan.
- On August 26, Haukar signed Dutch-American Gerald Robinson. He spent the previous season with ÍR where he went with the team to the Úrvalsdeild Finals where it lost to KR.
- On August 27, KR signed Michael Craion who won two national championships with the team in 2015 and 2016. He spent the 2018–19 with Keflavík and later ADA Blois Basket 41 in the French LNB Pro B, after Keflavík was knocked from the Úrvalsdeild playoffs.
- On August 28, Grindavík signed Dagur Kár Jónsson to a 2-year contract. Dagur Kár, who played the 2018–19 season with Flyers Wels in the Österreichische Basketball Bundesliga, had previously played for Grindavík from 2016 2018.
- On August 29, Valur signed Icelandic national team member Frank Aron Booker. Booker's father, Frank Booker, played for Valur from 1991 to 1994 and led the team to the Úrvalsdeild Finals in 1992.
- On September 9, it was reported that the board of Þór Akureyri was contemplating to withdraw the team from the Úrvalsdeild due to financial difficulties. The day after, Þór announced that they had solved the issue and would play in the league this season.
- On September 10, Icelandic national team player Kári Jónsson signed back with his hometown team of Haukar.
- On October 21, Njarðvík released Evaldas Žabas after appearing in three games where he averaged 12.0 points and 3.3 assists.
- On October 23, Sigurður Þorsteinsson ÍR, signing a two-year contract, after a short stint with BC Orchies which ended prematurely due to the club's financial difficulties.
- On 28 October, Icelandic national team player Breki Gylfason returned to the Úrvalsdeild after spending the previous season with the Appalachian State University basketball team and signed with his former team Haukar.
- On October 31, Valur point guard, Chris Jones, refused to play the second half of Valur's game against Keflavík, effectively ending his stay with the club. Valur officially terminated its contract with Jones the following day.
- On 6 November, Njarðvík signed point guard Chaz Williams.
- On 6 November, Daði Berg Grétarsson of ÍR was suspended for three games for pushing Mantas Virbalas of Þór Akureyri to the ground and twice kicking the ball so it hit Virbalas where he lay on the floor. Virbalas was suspended for one game for his retaliation towards Daði Berg.
- On 8 November, KR's star player Jón Arnór Stefánsson was injured in the fourth quarter of KR's loss against Tindastóll after colliding with Helgi Rafn Viggósson. After the game, the coach of KR, Ingi Þór Steinþórsson was livid and accused Helgi of deliberately injuring Jón Arnór, which Helgi Rafn denied. Later, the two were spotted having a heated argument before Helgi left the stadium.
- On 11 November, former Icelandic national team member Danero Thomas signed with ÍR where he previously had played during the 2017–18 season. He had started the season with Hamar in the 1. deild karla where he averaged 17.2 points and 6.0 rebounds in six games, all wins.
- On 21 November, Valur signed P.J. Alawoya, who won the national championship and the Icelandic Cup with KR in 2017.
- On 29 November, Stjarnan blew out defending champions KR, 110–67. It was the largest defeat by a reigning national champion since name change of the league in 1978 and KR's largest defeat in the top-tier league.
- On 4 December, Stjarnan signed Icelandic national team player Gunnar Ólafsson.
- On 12 December, suspicions rose that the results in a game between ÍR and Tindastóll had been fixed after unusual amounts where betted in ÍR's victory despite Tindastóll being heavy favorites to win. After an investigation by the Icelandic Basketball Association, Íslenskar Getraunir, the Global Lottery Monitory System and independent investigators who reviewed the game, it was concluded that no fixing had occurred. It stated that the reason for the high amount of betting was most likely due to the common knowledge that the team's travel to Reykjavík from Sauðárkrókur took several hours due to weather conditions and the game had to be postponed for an hour due to that.
- On 31 January, KR announced it had signed point guard Mike DiNunno for the rest of the season. DiNunno had finished the previous season with the team and was a key factor in their national championship run.
- On 5 March, Brynjar Þór Björnsson announced he would not play in KR's upcoming game against Stjarnan due to the coronavirus pandemic in the country without consulting the team first.
