= 2021–22 Úrvalsdeild karla (basketball) =

Subway deild karla^{1}
- Duration: 7 October 2021 – 18 May 2022
- Games played: 159
- Teams: 12
- TV partner: Stöð 2 Sport

Regular season
- Deildarmeistarar: Njarðvík
- Relegated: Vestri, Þór Akureyri

Finals
- Champions: Valur
- Runners-up: Tindastóll
- Semi-finalists: Njarðvík, Þór Þorlákshöfn
- Finals MVP: (Iceland) Kári Jónsson

Statistical leaders
Points	(United States) Everage Richardson	25.5
Rebounds	(Montenegro) Nemanja Knezevic	12.1
Assists	(Iceland) Hörður Vilhjálmsson	7.9

Records
- Biggest home win: Breiðablik 135–87 KR (24 January 2022)
- Biggest away win: Vestri 117–73 Þór Akureyri (7 March 2022)
- Highest scoring: Þór Þorlákshöfn 136–116 Breiðablik (18 February 2022)
- Winning streak: 10; Valur
- Losing streak: 11; Þór Akureyri
- All statistics correct as of 19 May 2022.^{1} Sponsored league name, referring to Úrvalsdeild karla.

The 2021–22 Úrvalsdeild karla was the 71st season of the Úrvalsdeild karla, the top tier men's basketball league in Iceland. The season started on 7 October 2021 and ended on 18 May 2022. Valur won its third title, and its first in 39 years, by defeating Tindastóll 3–2 in the Finals.

== Competition format ==
The participating teams first played a conventional round-robin schedule with every team playing each opponent once home and once away for a total of 22 games. The top eight teams qualified for the championship playoffs whilst the two last qualified were relegated to Division 1.

== Teams ==
Team	City, Region	Arena	Head coach
Breiðablik	Kópavogur	Smárinn	(Iceland) Pétur Ingvarsson
Grindavík	Grindavík	Mustad Höllin	(Iceland) Sverrir Þór Sverrisson
ÍR	Reykjavík	Hertz Hellirinn	(Iceland) Friðrik Ingi Rúnarsson
Keflavík	Keflavík	TM Höllin	(Iceland) Hjalti Þór Vilhjálmsson
KR	Reykjavík	DHL Höllin	(Iceland) Helgi Már Magnússon
Njarðvík	Njarðvík	Ljónagryfjan	(Iceland) Benedikt Guðmundsson
Stjarnan	Garðabær	Ásgarður	(Iceland) Arnar Guðjónsson
Tindastóll	Sauðárkrókur	Síkið	(Iceland) Baldur Þór Ragnarsson
Valur	Reykjavík	Origo-höllin	(Iceland) Finnur Freyr Stefánsson
Vestri	Ísafjörður	Jakinn	(Iceland) Pétur Már Sigurðsson
Þór Akureyri	Akureyri	Höllin	(Iceland) Bjarki Ármann Oddsson
Þór Þorlákshöfn	Þorlákshöfn	Icelandic Glacial Höllin	(Iceland) Lárus Jónsson

=== Managerial changes ===
Team	Outgoing manager	Manner of departure	Date of vacancy	Position in table	Replaced with	Date of appointment
Njarðvík	(Iceland) Einar Árni Jóhannsson	End of contract	16 May 2021	Off-season	(Iceland) Benedikt Guðmundsson	30 May 2021
KR	(Iceland) Darri Freyr Atlason	Resigned	24 June 2021	Off-season	(Iceland) Helgi Már Magnússon	6 August 2021
ÍR	(North Macedonia) Borce Ilievski	Resigned	22 October 2021	12th	(Iceland) Friðrik Ingi Rúnarsson	8 November 2021
Grindavík	(Iceland) Daníel Guðni Guðmundsson	Fired	21 February 2022	6th	(Iceland) Sverrir Þór Sverrisson	25 February 2022

== Regular season ==
=== Standings ===
Pos	Team	Pld	W	L	PF	PA	PD	Pts	Qualification or relegation
1	Njarðvík	22	17	5	2130	1917	+213	34	Qualification to playoffs
2	Þór Þorlákshöfn	22	17	5	2157	1947	+210	34	Qualification to playoffs
3	Valur	22	14	8	1844	1744	+100	28	Qualification to playoffs
4	Tindastóll	22	14	8	1957	1919	+38	28	Qualification to playoffs
5	Keflavík	22	14	8	1964	1889	+75	28	Qualification to playoffs
6	Stjarnan	22	13	9	1991	1907	+84	26	Qualification to playoffs
7	Grindavík	22	11	11	1873	1889	−16	22	Qualification to playoffs
8	KR	22	10	12	1975	2018	−43	20	Qualification to playoffs
9	Breiðablik	22	9	13	2338	2326	+12	18	
10	ÍR	22	8	14	1954	1951	+3	16	
11	Vestri	22	4	18	1774	2016	−242	8	Relegated to 1. deild
12	Þór Akureyri	22	1	21	1722	2156	−434	2	Relegated to 1. deild

Updated to match(es) played on 1 April 2022. Source: Icelandic Basketball Association

== Playoffs ==
=== Bracket ===
Quarterfinals
1	Njarðvík	3
8	KR	0
4	Tindastóll	3
5	Keflavík	2
(Pairings are reseeded after the first round)
2	Þór Þorlákshöfn	3
7	Grindavík	2
3	Valur	3
6	Stjarnan	0

Semifinals
1	Njarðvík	1
4	Tindastóll	3
2	Þór Þorlákshöfn	0
3	Valur	3

Finals
3	Valur	3
4	Tindastóll	2

== Notable occurrences ==
- On 8 June, Keflavík signed Jaka Brodnik who previously played for Tindastóll.
- On 13 June, it was reported that Þór Akureyri's guard Júlíus Orri Ágústsson would leave the team and play for Caldwell University.
- On 24 June, it was reported that Danero Thomas signed with newly promoted Breiðablik after playing with ÍR the previous two seasons.
- On 25 June, it was reported that Everage Richardson had signed with Breiðablik after one season with ÍR.
- On 25 June, it was reported that Iceland national team member Breki Gylfason had signed with ÍR after having played previously for Haukar.
- On 28 June, Iceland national team member Sigtryggur Arnar Björnsson signed with Tindastóll after playing in the LEB Oro the previous season.
- On 29 June, Tindastóll signed Ireland national team member Taiwo Badmus.
- On 30 June, Tindastóll signed former NBA G League player Javon Bess.
- On 12 July, Tindastóll signed Sweden national team member Thomas Massamba.
- On 13 July, Keflavík signed Iceland national team member Halldór Garðar Hermannsson from reigning national champions Þór Þorlákshöfn.
- On 15 July, Þór Þorlákshöfn announced it had signed Denmark national team member Daniel Mortensen and Lithuanian Ronaldas Rutkauskas.
- On 20 July, reigning Úrvalsdeild Foreign Player of the Year, Deane Williams, signed with LNB Pro B club Saint-Quentin after two seasons with Keflavík.
- On 4 August, Grindavík signed Spanish center Ivan Aurrecoechea who played the previous season with Þór Akureyri.
- On 8 August, Keflavík signed David Okeke who won the Georgian Superliga championship with BC Rustavi the previous season.
- On 9 August, Iceland national team member Ragnar Nathanaelsson signed with Stjarnan after spending the previous season with Haukar.
- On 14 August, former Argentina national team member Nicolás Richotti signed with Njarðvík.
- On 17 August, ÍR signed Shakir Smith.
- On 21 August, Njarðvík signed Former Liga ACB player Fotios Lampropoulos.
- On 24 August, Þór Akureyri signed Ireland national team member Jordan Blount.
- On 28 August, Valur signed Iceland national team member Kári Jónsson.
- On 3 September, Finnur Atli Magnússon signed with Haukar.
- On 11 September, Valur signed Callum Lawson who won the national championship with Þór Þorlákshöfn the previous season.
- On 2 October, Dagur Kár Jónsson left Grindavík and signed with Club Ourense Baloncesto of the LEB Plata.
- On 29 October, Grindavík signed E. C. Matthews.
- On 8 November, Þór Akureyri signed former Switzerland national team member Jeremy Landenbergue to replace injured Jordan Blount.
- On 9 November, Þór Akureyri signed Reggie Keely to replace injured Jonathan Lawton.
- On 11 November, Sigurður Þorsteinsson became the 11th player to grab 2,000 career rebounds in the Úrvalsdeild.
- On 17 November, ÍR signed Igor Marić.
- On 10 December, Keflavík star forward David Okeke suffered an achilles injury in a game against Tindastóll. Prior to the injury he had grabbed a season high 17 rebounds in the game.
- On 30 December, Tindastóll signed Zoran Vrkić to replace Thomas Massamba.
- On 2 January, it was reported that Breiðablik had signed Frank Aron Booker.
- On 14 January, it was reported that KR had signed Finland national team member Carl Lindbom.
- On 4 April, KR announced it had reached an agreement with Isaiah Manderson to release him from his contract just before the start of the playoffs.
