= Borce Ilievski =

ÍR
- Position: Head coach
- League: Úrvalsdeild karla

Personal information
- Born: August 3, 1972 (age 54) Štip, Macedonia, Yugoslavia

Career information
- Playing career: 1988–1994

Career history

Playing
- 1988–1992: BC Stip
- 1992–1993: BC Sloga
- 1993–1994: BC Madjari Skopje

Coaching
- 1998–2003: BC Stip
- 2004–2005: BC Polo Trejd
- 2006: KFÍ (assistant)
- 2006–2010: KFÍ
- 2010–2011: Tindastóll
- 2012: Bolungarvík
- 2012–2014: Breiðablik
- 2015: ÍR (assistant)
- 2015–2021: ÍR
- 2022–2024: Fjölnir
- 2024–present: ÍR

Career highlights
- As coach: Úrvalsdeild Coach of the Year (2019); 1. deild karla winner (2010); 1. deild karla Coach of the Year (2010)

Borce Ilievski Sansa (born August 3, 1972) is a Macedonian-Icelandic professional basketball coach. In 2019 he was named the Úrvalsdeild karla Coach of the Year after guiding ÍR to the Úrvalsdeild finals.

== Coaching career ==
In 2006, Ilievski was hired as an assistant coach to KFÍ's men's team as well as the head coach of the club's youth program. He took over as head coach of the men's team in end of November 2006 after Baldur Ingi Jónasson resigned. After winning the 1. deild karla with the team in 2010, and achieving promotion to the top-tier Úrvalsdeild karla, Ilievski was not retained by the club at the conclusion of his contract despite also being the 1. deild karla Coach of the Year.

In May 2010, Ilievski went on to sign with Úrvalsdeild club Tindastóll. He guided Tindastóll to a 9th-place finish with a 7–14 record during his first season. He resigned as head coach three games into his second season after a disagreement with board about the need to strengthen the roster.

He guided 2. deild karla club Bolungarvík for the final games of the 2011–2012 season, where the team bowed out in the first round of the playoffs.

In June 2012, Ilievski was hired as the head coach of Breiðablik. After guiding the team to a 9–9 record, he received a two-year contract extension in April 2013. In December 2014, he was relieved of his duties as head coach by the board of Breiðablik.

After starting the 2015–2016 as an assistant coach to ÍR, Ilievski was promoted to head coach when Bjarni Magnússon resigned as head coach six games into the season. He guided the club to the playoffs during his second season where it was swept by Stjarnan in the first round.

In 2018, Ilievski led ÍR to the second best record in the league. They faced Stjarnan in the first round of the playoffs for the second straight year in what turned out to be a heated series. In game three of the series, Stjarnan's Hlynur Bæringsson was fouled hard by ÍR's Ryan Taylor After the game he experienced concussion like symptoms and was ultimately ruled out of game four which Stjarnan eventually lost after Danero Thomas scored the game winning basket at the buzzer. Although Taylor received an unsportsmanlike foul, he was not ejected from the game. After the game he received a three-game suspension from the league. In the semi-finals, ÍR ultimately lost to Tindastóll in four games.

In February 2019, Ilievski led ÍR to the semi-finals of the Icelandic Cup where it faced Stjarnan in a tension filled game were fighting broke out between fans during the game. ÍR ultimately lost the game, 87–73. In the Úrvalsdeild, ÍR finished with the 7th best record and faced second seed Njarðvík in the first round. After losing the first two games in the best-of-five series, ÍR unexpectedly won the next three and knocked out Njarðvík. In the semi-finals, ÍR faced top-seed and heavy title favorites Stjarnan. After losing the first game by 33 points, ÍR bounced back and took the next two games before Stjarnan tying the series with a comfortable 90–75 victory in game four. In game five, ÍR came out on top with an 83–79 victory and advanced to the finals. In the finals, ÍR lost 2–3 to KR after leading 2–1. After the season, Ilievski was named as the Úrvalsdeild Coach of the Year.

Ilievski resigned from ÍR following a 0–3 start to the 2021–22 season.

In May 2022, Ilievski was hired as the head coach of Fjölnir men's team.

On 18 November 2024, Ilievski resigned from Fjölnir and returned to ÍR as its head coach.

== Head coaching record ==
Season	Team	Tier	League	Pos.	W–L	Playoffs	Icelandic Cup
2006–07	KFÍ	2	1. deild karla	6th	5–9	DNQ	N/A^{1}
2007–08	KFÍ	2	1. deild karla	6th	8–10	DNQ	1st Round
2008–09	KFÍ	2	1. deild karla	5th	11–7	Semi-finals	1st Round
2009–10	KFÍ	2	1. deild karla	1st	16–2	N/A	2nd Round
2010–11	Tindastóll	1	Úrvalsdeild karla	9th	7-15	DNQ	Semi-finals
2011–12	Tindastóll	1	Úrvalsdeild karla	11th	0-3	N/A	N/A
2011–12	Bolungarvík	3	2. deild karla Group B	3rd	1–0	1st Round	N/A
2012–13	Breiðablik	2	1. deild karla	6th	9-9	DNQ	1st Round
2013–14	Breiðablik	2	1. deild karla	5th	10-8	1st Round	1st Round
2014–15	Breiðablik	2	1. deild karla	N/A	4-5	N/A	1st Round
2015–16	ÍR	1	Úrvalsdeild karla	10th	4-12	DNQ	N/A^{1}
2016–17	ÍR	1	Úrvalsdeild karla	7th	11-11	1st Round	2nd Round
2017–18	ÍR	1	Úrvalsdeild karla	2nd	16-6	Semi-finals	3rd Round
2018–19	ÍR	1	Úrvalsdeild karla	7th	10-12	Finals	Semi-finals
2019–20	ÍR	1	Úrvalsdeild karla	7th	11-10	Canceled^{2}	1st round
2020–21	ÍR	1	Úrvalsdeild karla	10th	8-14	DNQ	Semi-finals
2021–22	ÍR	1	Úrvalsdeild karla	12th	0-3	N/A	2nd round^{3}

=== Notes ===
^{1} The team was eliminated from the Cup prior to Ilievski's hiring.
^{2} Playoffs and final regular season game canceled because of the COVID-19 outbreak in Iceland.
^{3} ÍR had advanced to the 2nd round of the Cup prior to Ilievski's resignation.

== Titles and awards ==
=== Titles ===
- 1. deild karla
  - Winner: 2010

=== Awards ===
- Úrvalsdeild karla Coach of the Year
  - 2019
- 1. deild karla Coach of the Year
  - 2010
