= 2017–18 Úrvalsdeild karla =

Domino's deild karla^{1}
- Duration: 5 October 2017 – 28 April 2018
- Teams: 12
- TV partner: Stöð 2 Sport

Regular season
- Top seed: Haukar
- Relegated: Höttur; Þór Akureyri

Finals
- Champions: KR
- Runners-up: Tindastóll
- Semi-finalists: Haukar; ÍR

Statistical leaders
Points	(United States) Kelvin Lewis	25.4
Rebounds	(United States) Urald King	14.6
Assists	(Iceland) Pavel Ermolinskij	7.0

Records
- Highest scoring: Valur 110–104 Stjarnan (10 November 2017)
- Winning streak: Haukar; 8 games
- Losing streak: Höttur; 14 games
- All statistics correct as of 28 April 2018.^{1} Sponsored league name, referring to Úrvalsdeild karla.

The 2017–18 Úrvalsdeild karla was the 67th season of the Úrvalsdeild, the top tier men's basketball league in Iceland. The season started on October 5, 2017 and ended on April 28, 2018. KR won its fifth title in a row by defeating Tindastóll 3–1 in the Finals.

== Competition format ==
The participating teams first played a conventional round-robin schedule with every team playing each opponent once home and once away for a total of 22 games. The top eight teams qualified for the championship playoffs whilst the two last qualified were relegated to Division 1.

== Teams ==
Location of teams in 2017–18 Premier League
Clubs in Reykjavík: ÍR, KR, Valur

Team	City, Region	Arena	Head coach
Grindavík	Grindavík	Mustad Höllin	(Iceland) Jóhann Þór Ólafsson
ÍR	Reykjavík	Hertz Hellirinn	(North Macedonia) Borce Ilievski
Keflavík	Keflavík	TM Höllin	(Iceland) Friðrik Ingi Rúnarsson
KR	Reykjavík	DHL Höllin	(Iceland) Finnur Freyr Stefánsson
Haukar	Hafnarfjörður	Schenkerhöllin	(Iceland) Ívar Ásgrímsson
Höttur	Egilsstaðir	Egilsstaðir	(Iceland) Viðar Örn Hafsteinsson
Njarðvík	Njarðvík	green/white	(Iceland) Daníel Guðmundsson
Stjarnan	Garðabær	Ásgarður	(Iceland) Hrafn Kristjánsson
Tindastóll	Sauðárkrókur	Sauðárkrókur	(Spain) Israel Martín
Valur	Reykjavík	Valshöllin	(Iceland) Ágúst Björgvinsson
Þór Akureyri	Akureyri	Höllin Ak	(Iceland) Hjalti Þór Vilhjálmsson
Þór Þorlákshöfn	Þorlákshöfn	Icelandic Glacial Höllin	(Iceland) Einar Árni Jóhannsson

== Regular season ==
Pos	Team	Pld	W	L	PF	PA	PD	Pts	Qualification or relegation
1	Haukar	22	17	5	1960	1712	+248	34	Qualification to playoffs
2	ÍR	22	16	6	1801	1729	+72	32	Qualification to playoffs
3	Tindastóll	22	16	6	1929	1748	+181	32	Qualification to playoffs
4	KR	22	15	7	1875	1721	+154	30	Qualification to playoffs
5	Njarðvík	22	13	9	1903	1875	+28	26	Qualification to playoffs
6	Grindavík	22	13	9	1974	1898	+76	26	Qualification to playoffs
7	Stjarnan	22	11	11	1855	1804	+51	22	Qualification to playoffs
8	Keflavík	22	10	12	1874	1899	−25	20	Qualification to playoffs
9	Þór Þorl	22	9	13	1804	1856	−52	18	
10	Valur	22	7	15	1821	1959	−138	14	
11	Þór Akureyri (R)	22	3	19	1689	1938	−249	6	Relegated
12	Höttur (R)	22	2	20	1656	2002	−346	4	Relegated

Source: KKÍ
(R) Relegated

== Playoffs ==
The playoffs are played between the eight first qualified teams with a 1-1-1-1-1 format, playing seeded teams games 1, 3 and 5 at home.

=== Bracket ===
Quarterfinals
1	Haukar	3
8	Keflavík	2
4	KR	3
5	Njarðvík	0
(Pairings are reseeded after the first round)
2	ÍR	3
7	Stjarnan	1
3	Tindastóll	3
6	Grindavík	0

Semifinals
1	Haukar	1
4	KR	3
2	ÍR	1
3	Tindastóll	3

Finals
3	Tindastóll	1
4	KR	3

Source: KKÍ

=== Quarterfinals ===
Team 1	Series	Team 2	Game 1	Game 2	Game 3	Game 4	Game 5
Haukar	3–2	Keflavík	83–72	85–82	78–81	72–75	72–66
ÍR	3–1	Stjarnan	79–73	57–64	67–64	71–69	
Tindastóll	3–0	Grindavík	96–92	114–83	84–81		
KR	3–0	Njarðvík	89–74	91–66	81–71		

=== Semifinals ===
Team 1	Series	Team 2	Game 1	Game 2	Game 3	Game 4	Game 5
Haukar	1–3	KR	76–67	80–88	83–84	85–79	
ÍR	1–3	Tindastóll	82–89	106–97	69–84	87–90	

=== Final ===
Team 1	Series	Team 2	Game 1	Game 2	Game 3	Game 4	Game 5
Tindastóll	1–3	KR	54–75	98–70	75–77	73–89	

== Clubs in European competitions ==
Icelandic teams returned to European competitions nine years after their last participation.

Team	Competition	Progress
KR	FIBA Europe Cup	First qualifying round

== Notable occurrences ==
- On September 12, Keflavík signed Kevin Young, a former starter at University of Kansas.
- On September 21, Grindavík signed Rashad Whack.
- On October 3, Keflavík signed Cameron Forte to replace Kevin Young.
- On October 6, a game between Grindavík and Þór Þorlákshöfn was postponed after the majority of Þór's players had contracted food poisioning.
- On October 8, Haukar released Roger Woods after just one game and signed Paul Jones in his place.
- On October 10, Höttur released Taylor Stafford and signed Aaron Moss in his place. Moss had played for Höttur the previous season in Division I.
- On October 12, Georgía Olga Kristiansen became the first female referee to officiate in the Úrvalsdeild karla.
- On October 13, KR announced that reigning domestic player of the year, Jón Arnór Stefánsson, had undergone arthroscopy and would not return to the court until January.
- On October 13, Haukar signed Icelandic national team player Kári Jónsson, who had spent the previous season with Drexel University.
- On October 15, Stjarnan signed Stefan Bonneau to a one-month deal with a team option of extending it to the end of the season.
- On October 16, Njarðvík released Jón Arnór Sverrisson at his own request. Two days later he signed with Reykjanesbær rival Keflavík.
- On November 2, Valur signed Gunnar Ingi Harðarson for the rest of the season. He had previously been playing for Belmont Abbey College.
- On November 3, Stefan Bonneau left Stjarnan due to a back injury after appearing in two games.
- On November 6, Höttur replaced Aaron Moss with Kelvin Lewis.
- On November 10, Tindastóll announced that Antonio Hester would likely miss several months because of an ankle injury. Initially it was thought that the ankle was broken. Tindastóll signed Brandon Garrett while Hester was recovering.
- On November 10, Brynjar Þór Björnsson passed Guðni Ólafur Guðnason and became KR's all-time leading scorer in the Úrvalsdeild karla.
- On November 13, KR's point guard, Arnór Hermannsson, broke his hand and was expected to miss four to six weeks. Due to his injury and others, KR signed American Zac Carter who had recently been released from Division I club Skallagrímur.
- On November 15, the Icelandic Basketball Federation announced that the 4+1 rule regarding foreign players would not include European Union players starting next season as the EFTA Surveillance Authority had declared it was in violation of the European Free Trade Association agreement.
- On November 15, Keflavík released Cameron Forte and signed former Orlando Magic player Stanley Robinson in his place.
- On November 21, Þór Þorlákshöfn announced that starting center Snorri Hrafnkelsson would miss several weeks after contracting Infectious mononucleosis.
- On December 7, Georgía Olga Kristiansen and Davíð Tómas Tómasson became the first siblings to officiate together a highest competitive tier game in Iceland.
- On December 12, Grindavík released Rashad Whack, after averaging a team leading 22.8 points in 10 games.
- On December 15, Ryan Taylor was named the best player of the first half of the season and to the All-First team of the first half of the season, along with Matthías Orri Sigurðarson, Kári Jónsson, Sigtryggur Arnar Björnsson and Hlynur Bæringsson. Borce Ilievski of ÍR was named the best coach of the first half of the season while Urald King was named the best defender and Kári Jónsson the best young player of the first half.
- On December 19, Þór Akureyri signed Nino Johnson to replace injured Marques Oliver.
- On December 21, J'Nathan Bullock signed with Grindavík for the rest of the season. He previously played with Grindavík during the 2011–12 season, helping the club to the national championship.
- On December 27, Hörður Axel Vilhjálmsson signed with Keflavík for the rest of the season after starting it with Astana of the VTB United League.
- On January 2, Keflavík announced they had released Stanley Robinson and signed Dominique Elliott in his place.
- On January 7, Þór Akureyri won Keflavík, 100-98, for the first time in Keflavík in the Úrvalsdeild karla with Ingvi Rafn Ingvarsson scoring Þór's last thirteen points of the game. They had lost their previous 21 games in Keflavík.
- On January 8, Tindastóll's Chris Caird announced he was retiring from playing basketball due to injuries and had accepted to become an assistant coach to Israel Martín. He had appeared in 9 games during the season, averaging 12.4 and 4.4 rebounds.
- On January 12, the day before their game against Tindastóll in the Icelandic Basketball Cup finals, KR announced that it had released Jalen Jenkins and signed Brandon Penn in his place.
- On January 15, Þór Akureyri announced that due to Marques Oliver's speedy recovery from injury, he would return to the team in February.
- On January 24, Þór Þorlákshöfn signed Chaz Williams for the rest of the season.
- On January 24, it was reported that FIBA had recalled Njarðvík's Kristinn Pálsson letter of clearance. His former team, Stella Azzura, had demanded training compensations of 65.000 euros for the player. Kristinn was part of Njarðvík's junior teams until the age of 16, when he joined Stella Azzura. After two years with Stella Azzura, he joined Marist College in 2015 before returning to Iceland in 2018.
- On January 24, referee Ísak Ernir Kristinsson ejected a fan from a game between ÍR and Njarðvík's after the fan had leaned over him from the sidelines and called him a racist.
- On January 25, Höttur ended its 14-game losing streak with an 86-75 overtime victory against Þór Akureyri. It was Andrée Michelsson, Höttur's point guard, first Úrvalsdeild victory in 35 games. He had started his career with Snæfell the previous season when it went 0-22.
- On January 26, Tindastóll signed Chris Davenport to replace Brandon Garrett, who was released shortly after Tindastóll's Icelandic Basketball Cup win on January 13.
- On January 26, Keflavík signed Christian Jones with the intention on having him split minutes with Dominique Elliott. They also released point guard Hilmar Pétursson, who subsequently signed with Haukar.
- On February 3, Stjarnan released Sherrod Wright and signed Darell Combs instead.
- On February 3, KR signed American Kendall Pollard for the rest of the season.
- On February 17, Þór Þorlákshöfn announced that Einar Árni Jóhannsson would leave his post as head coach at the season's end and would be replaced by assistant coach Baldur Þór Ragnarsson.
- On February 20, Haukar's Kári Jónsson broke his right thumb on a practice with the Icelandic national team and was expected to miss up to 4 weeks, including the national team games and the final three games of the regular season.
- On February 21, Höttur announced they had released Kelvin Lewis to allow him to sign with Kauhajoki Karhu Basket in the Finnish Korisliiga. Höttur was already relegated and planned to play the final three games without a foreign player.
- On March 8, Haukar defeated Valur and finished with the best record in the Úrvalsdeild karla for the first time in its history.
- On March 12, Brynjar Þór Björnsson broke a finger on practice and was expected to miss KR's first round playoff series against Njarðvík.
- On March 15, Stjarnan lockerroom was trashed by unknown individuals during the first game of its first-round series against ÍR.
- On March 20, Kári Jónsson scored 6 of his 27 points in the last 3.4 seconds in game two of Haukar's first round series against Keflavík, giving them an 82-85 victory. After being fouled in the act of shooting with 3.4 second remaining, he made all three free throws and tied the game at 82-82. After a timeout by Keflavík, Haukar stole the inbound pass allowing Kári to heave up a cross-court shot from his own free throw line that went in.
- On March 25, Danero Thomas scored the game winning and series clinching basket in game five of ÍR's first round playoffs series against Stjarnan.
- On April 14, it was announced that Marcus Walker had been called up to KR for the rest of the playoffs due to injuries to Jón Arnór Stefánsson. He had played with KR-b in the Icelandic Cup earlier in the season.
- On April 25, Brynjar Þór Björnsson scored a buzzer beater to give KR a 75–77 victory against Tindastóll and a 2–1 lead in the finals series.
