= Vestri (men's basketball) =

- Leagues: 2. deild karla
- Founded: 1965 (as KFÍ)
- History: KFÍ (1965–2016); Vestri (2016–present)
- Arena: Ísjakinn (capacity: 1200)
- Location: Ísafjörður, Iceland
- Team colors: Navy blue, red, white
- Championships: 4 Division I 3 Division II
- Website: Vestri.is
Home	Away

The Vestri men's basketball team, commonly known as Vestri, is a basketball team based in Ísafjörður, Iceland. The club was founded in 1965 as Körfuknattleiksfélag Ísafjarðar and held that name until it merged with newly founded Íþróttafélagið Vestri multi-sport club in 2016 and became its basketball department.

== History ==
The club was founded in 1965 as Körfuknattleiksfélag Ísafjarðar (KFÍ). In 1967 it reached the final of the Icelandic Cup where it lost to KR.

In March 1983, KFÍ finished first in its group in 2. deild karla and played Laugdælir, Breiðablik and Íþróttafélag Menntaskólans á Egilsstöðum (ÍME) in they playoffs for the 2. deild championship and promotion to 1. deild karla. According to the rules at the time, each team would play the other three once and the team with the best win–loss record would be crowned champions. KFÍ lost its first game to Breiðablik, 79–76, despite 29 points from Guðjón Már Þorsteinsson and 21 points from Jón Oddsson. In the second game, against Laugdælir, KFÍ scored the last 4 points of the game, winning 79–76, with Kristinn Kristjánsson scoring 23 points, Jón Oddsson 17 points and Guðjón Már Þorsteinsson 16 points. In the final game, KFÍ defeated ÍME 91–70. Both Breiðablik and Laugdælir also won two out of three games, tied with KFÍ. As the rules did not count for any tie-breakers, the three teams were slated to meet again to decide the winner. During the second try, KFÍ lost to Breiðablik in the first game, 78–77, but won Laugdælir in the second game 79–76. Laugdælir however won Breiðablik leaving the teams again tied, thus meaning that a third playoff would be held to decide the winner. During the third playoff, KFÍ won Breiðablik but lost to Laugdælir. As Breiðablik won Laugdælir the teams were once again tied. Prior to the fourth playoffs, the Icelandic Basketball Federation decided that if the teams would once again finish tied, the team with the best scoring record would finish first. The fourth playoff was held from 30 April to 2 May and there Laugdælir won both KFÍ and Breiðablik convincingly and were crowned 2. deild karla champions.

In 1994, the team won the 2. deild karla playoffs, which was held jointly in Ísafjörður and Bolungarvík, after defeating Þór Þorlákshöfn 75–48, and was promoted to 1. deild karla. In 1996, it gained promotion to the top-tier Úrvalsdeild karla for the first time.

On 17 October 1999, KFÍ won Skallagrímur, 129–132, in a game that went into four overtimes. It was the longest Úrvalsdeild karla game ever played in Iceland. Clifton Bush set a then record by playing 59 minutes in the game. It has since been broken by Hörður Axel Vilhjálmsson.

In 2016, KFÍ merged into Íþróttafélagið Vestri and became its basketball sub-division.

On 16 December 2018, while playing in the second-tier 1. deild karla, it knocked out top-tier Haukar in the Final 16 of the Icelandic Cup. It was the only team outside the top-tier Úrvalsdeild to appear in the Final 8 of the cup.

In June 2021, Vestri defeated Hamar in the 1. deild promotion finals and achieved promotion to the Úrvalsdeild.

== Head coaches ==
Men's head coaches:

- Ingvar Sigurbjörnsson 1982–1983
- Geir Þorsteinsson 1993–1995
- Guðjón Már Þorsteinsson 1995–1996
- Guðni Ólafur Guðnason 1996–1998
- Tony Garbelotto 1998–2000
- Karl Jónsson 2000–2001
- Hrafn Kristjánsson 2001–2004
- Baldur Ingi Jónasson 2001–2002, 2004–2006
- Borce Ilievski 2006–2010
- B.J. Aldridge 2010
- Neil Shiran Þórisson 2010–2011
- Pétur Már Sigurðsson 2011–2013
- Birgir Örn Birgisson 2013–2016
- Neil Shiran Þórisson and Guðni Ólafur Guðnason 2016
- Yngvi Gunnlaugsson 2016–2019
- Pétur Már Sigurðsson 2019–2024
- Birgir Örn Birgisson 2024–2026
- Fernando Bethencourt Muñoz 2026–present

== Season by season ==
Season	Division		Regular season			Playoff Results	Head coach
Season	Division		W	L	PCT	Playoff Results	Head coach
KFÍ
1979–1980	2. deild V	1st	2	0	1.000	Won Semifinals (Höttur, 1–0); Won Finals (Haukar, 1–0); Lost Promotion final (Skallagrímur, 0–2)	
1980–1981	2. deild V	1st	2	0	1.000	Won Semifinals (Tindastóll, 1–0); Lost Finals (Haukar, 0–1)	
1981–1982	2. deild NV	3rd	1	3	.250	Did not qualify	
1982–1983	2. deild C	1st					Ingvar Sigurbjörnsson
...
1992–1993	2. deild V	2nd	3	3	.500	Did not qualify	Auðunn Einarsson
1993–1994	2. deild V	1st	–	–	–	Won Finals (Þór Þorlákshöfn, 1–0); Promoted do Division I	Geir Þorsteinsson
1994–1995	1. deild	3rd (Group 1)	15	5	.750	Did not qualify	Geir Þorsteinsson
1995–1996	1. deild	2nd	12	4	.750	Won Semifinals (ÍS, 2–0); Won Finals (Þór Þorlákshöfn, 2–1); Promoted to Úrvalsdeild	Guðjón Þorsteinsson
1996–1997	Úrvalsdeild	9th	9	13	.409	Did not qualify	Guðni Guðnason
1997–1998	Úrvalsdeild	5th	13	9	.591	Lost Quarterfinals (Njarðvík, 1–2)	Guðni Guðnason
1998–1999	Úrvalsdeild	3rd	15	7	.682	Won Quarterfinals (Tindastóll, 2–0); Lost Semifinals (Njarðvík, 1–3)	Tony Garbelotto
1999–2000	Úrvalsdeild	10th	7	15	.318	Did not qualify	Tony Garbelotto
2000–2001	Úrvalsdeild	12th	4	18	.182	Did not qualify Relegated to 1. deild	Karl Jónsson
2001–2002	1. deild	3rd	12	6	.667	Lost Semifinals (Snæfell, 0–2)	Hrafn Kristjánsson and Baldur Jónasson
2002–2003	1. deild	1st	14	2	.875	Won Semifinals (Ármann/Þróttur, 2–1); Won Finals (Þór Þorlákshöfn, 1–0); Promoted to Úrvalsdeild karla	Hrafn Kristjánsson
2003–2004	Úrvalsdeild	10th	6	16	.273	Did not qualify	Hrafn Kristjánsson
2004–2005	Úrvalsdeild	12th	2	20	.091	Did not qualify Relegated to 1. deild	Baldur Jónasson
2005–2006	1. deild	7th	6	12	.333	Did not qualify	Baldur Jónasson
2006–2007	1. deild	6th	5	9	.357	Did not qualify	Baldur Jónasson (0–3); Borce Ilievski (5–6)
2007–2008	1. deild	6th	8	10	.444	Did not qualify	Borce Ilievski
2008–2009	1. deild	5th	11	7	.611	Lost Semifinals (Valur, 1–2)	Borce Ilievski
2009–2010	1. deild	1st	16	2	.889	Promoted to Úrvalsdeild	Borce Ilievski
2010–2011	Úrvalsdeild	12th	5	17	.227	Did not qualify Relegated to 1. deild	B.J. Aldridge (2–6); Neil Shiran Þórisson (3–11)
2011–2012	1. deild	1st	17	1	.944	Promoted to Úrvalsdeild	Pétur Már Sigurðsson
2012–2013	Úrvalsdeild	10th	6	16	.273	Did not qualify	Pétur Már Sigurðsson
2013–2014	Úrvalsdeild	11th	4	18	.182	Did not qualify Relegated to 1. deild	Birgir Örn Birgisson
2014–2015	1. deild	7th	5	16	.238	Did not qualify	Birgir Örn Birgisson
2015–2016	1. deild	8th	4	14	.222	Did not qualify	Birgir Örn Birgisson (3–10); Neil Shiran Þórisson and Guðni Guðnason (1–4)
Vestri
2016–2017	1. deild	6th	8	16	.333	Did not qualify	Yngvi Gunnlaugsson
2017–2018	1. deild	4th	16	8	.667	Lost Semifinals (Breiðablik, 0–3)	Yngvi Gunnlaugsson
2018–2019	1. deild	5th	12	9	.571	Lost Semifinals (Fjölnir, 0–3)	Yngvi Gunnlaugsson
2019–2020	1. deild	4th	14	8	.636	Playoffs canceled due to COVID-19 outbreak.^{1}	Pétur Már Sigurðsson
2020–2021	1. deild	4th	9	7	.563	Won Quarterfinals (Fjölnir, 2–0); Won Semifinals (Skallagrímur, 3–0); Won Finals (Hamar, 3–1); Promoted to Úrvalsdeild	Pétur Már Sigurðsson
2021–2022	Úrvalsdeild	11th	4	18	.182	Did not qualify Relegated to 1. deild	Pétur Már Sigurðsson
2022–2023	2. deild	2nd	16	4	.800	Lost Semifinals (Snæfell, 0–1)	Pétur Már Sigurðsson
2023–2024	2. deild	1st	16	2	.889	Won Semifinals (Aþena/Leiknir, 1–0); Lost Finals (KV, 0–2)	Pétur Már Sigurðsson
2024–2025	2. deild	5th	10	8	.556	Lost Semifinals (Fylkir, 0–1)	Birgir Örn Birgisson
2025–2026	2. deild Group A	2nd	10	4	.714	Lost Semifinals (Laugdælir, 0–1)	Birgir Örn Birgisson

Notes
^{1}With two games left, the team had already secured the 3rd seed in the promotion playoffs when the rest of the season and playoffs was canceled.

== Trophies and awards ==
=== Trophies ===
- 1. deild karla:
  - Winners (4): 1996, 2003, 2010, 2012
- 2. deild karla:
  - Winners (3): 1975, 1980, 1994
- Icelandic Men's Basketball Cup:
  - Runners-up (1): 1998

=== Awards ===
- Úrvalsdeild Men's Domestic All-First Team
  - Friðrik Erlendur Stefánsson – 1998
- Úrvalsdeild Men's Young Player of the Year
  - Friðrik Erlendur Stefánsson – 1997
- Úrvalsdeild Men's Foreign Player of the Year
  - David Bevis – 1998
  - Joshua Helm – 2005

== Notable players ==
Note: Flags indicate national team eligibility at FIBA-sanctioned events. Players may hold other non-FIBA nationalities not displayed.

Criteria

To appear in this section a player must have either:

- Set a club record or won an individual award while at the club
- Played at least one official international match for their national team at any time
- Played at least one official NBA match at any time.

- (United States) Adam Spanich
- (Iceland) Baldur Ingi Jónasson
- (Iceland) Birgir Björn Pétursson
- (Iceland) Birgir Örn Birgisson
- (United States) Clifton Bush
- (United States) Craig Schoen
- (United States) Damier Pitts
- (United States) David Bevis
- (United States) Dwayne Fontana
- (Iceland) Einar Matthíasson
- (Iceland) Friðrik Erlendur Stefánsson
- (Iceland) Guðni Ólafur Guðnason
- (Iceland) Hrafn Kristjánsson
- (United States) Jeb Ivey
- (Iceland) Jón Oddsson
- (United States) Joshua Helm
- (Serbia) Nebojsa Knezevic
- (Montenegro) Nemanja Knezevic
- (Iceland) Ólafur Jón Ormsson
- (Iceland) Ómar Torfason
- (North Macedonia) Pance Ilievski
- (Iceland) Pétur Már Sigurðsson
- (United Kingdom) Ray Carter
- (United States) Sean Gibson
- (Iceland) Sigurður Þorsteinsson

== Records (Úrvalsdeild karla only) ==
- Points
  - Career: Baldur Ingi Jónasson, 1.459
  - Career average: Joshua Helm, 37.2
- 3 pointers
  - Career: Baldur Ingi Jónasson, 361
- Rebounds
  - Career: Friðrik Erlendur Stefánsson, 505
  - Career average: Joshua Helm, 14.0
- Assists
  - Career: Baldur Ingi Jónasson, 277
  - Career average: Bethuel Fletcher, 7.7
- Steals
  - Career: Baldur Ingi Jónasson, 188
  - Career average: Clifton Bush, 2.8
- Blocks
  - Career: Friðrik Erlendur Stefánsson, 51
  - Career average: Troy Wiley, 4.4
- Games
  - Career: Baldur Ingi Jónasson, 151
- Single season records
  - Points: Joshua Helm, 819
  - Points per game: Joshua Helm, 37.2
  - 3 pointers: Baldur Ingi Jónasson, 63
  - Rebounds: Joshua Helm, 309
  - Rebounds per game: Joshua Helm, 14.0
  - Assists: Tom Hull, 118
  - Assists per game: Bethuel Fletcher, 7.7
  - Steals: Ólafur Jón Ormsson, 66
  - Steals per game: Ólafur Jón Ormsson, 3.5
  - Blocks: Troy Wiley, 44
  - Blocks per game: Troy Wiley, 4.4
- Single game records
  - Points: Clifton Bush, 55
  - 3 pointers: Adam Spanich, 9
  - Rebounds: Friðrik Erlendur Stefánsson, James Cason, 24
  - Assists: Marcos Salas, Bethuel Fletcher, 12
  - Steals: Craig Schoen, 9
  - Blocks: Sigurður Gunnar Þorsteinsson, 8

== Reserve team ==
Vestri has a men's reserve team that plays in the amateur level Icelandic 4th-tier 3. deild karla, called Vestri-b and nicknamed Flaggskipið (English: The Flagship). In 2018 it was the runner-up to the 3. deild championship.

=== Season by season ===
Season	Tier	League	Pos.	W–L	Playoffs	Icelandic Cup
2015–16	4	3. deild karla	2nd	10–3	Semi-finals	DNP
2017–18	4	3. deild karla	2nd	8–4	Runner-up	1st Round
2018–19	4	3. deild karla	4th	7–7	DNQ	1st Round
2019–20	4	3. deild karla	9th	3–7	N/A	DNP
2020–21	4	3. deild karla	1st	3–0	N/A	DNP
