= Birgir Björn Pétursson =

Icelandic basketball player (born 1986)

Personal information
- Born: 24 January 1986 (age 40) Ísafjörður, Iceland
- Listed height: 206 cm (6 ft 9 in)
- Listed weight: 105 kg (231 lb)

Career information
- Playing career: 2001–2020
- Position: Center

Career history
- 2001–2006: KFÍ
- 2001–2003: → KFÍ-b
- 2006: Njarðvík
- 2006–2007: Þór Þorlákshöfn
- 2007–2009: KFÍ
- 2009–2011: Stjarnan
- 2011–2014: Valur
- 2014–2015: KFÍ
- 2015: UBC Münster
- 2016: KFÍ
- 2016–2018: Valur
- 2019–2020: Álftanes

Career highlights
- Icelandic Super Cup winner (2009)

Birgir Björn Pétursson (born 24 January 1986) is an Icelandic former basketball player.

== Playing career ==
=== KFÍ (2007–09) ===
After playing for Njarðvík and Þór Þorlákshöfn during the 2006–2007 season, Birgir joined his hometown team KFÍ again in 2007. During his second season he averaged 9.2 points and 9.1 rebounds and helped his team reach the playoffs where they lost 2–1 to Valur in the first round.

=== Stjarnan (2009–11) ===
Birgir signed with Úrvalsdeild karla club Stjarnan in 2009 and won the Icelandic Super Cup with the team in October of that year. Unhappy with his playing time during his second season, Birgir left the club in January 2011.

=== Valur (2011–14) ===
Birgir joined Division I club Valur in January 2011 and helped the team to get promoted to the Úrvalsdeild in 2013. On 14 November 2013, he grabbed a career high 25 rebounds against Þór Þorlákshöfn. For the 2013–2014 season he averaged 14.0 points and 9.9 rebounds (11th in league) but was unable to prevent the team to get relegated back to Division I.

=== KFÍ (2014–2015) ===
Birgir rejoined KFÍ in the summer of 2014. In September he scored a career high 31 points against Tindastóll which eventually ended second in the Icelandic Premier League. For the season he averaged 17.8 points and 12.5 rebounds, both career highs, while shooting 52% from the field.

=== UBC Münster (2015) ===
In September 2015 Birgir signed a three-month contract with UBC Münster in Germany. He left the club at the end of the contract in December.

=== KFÍ (2016) ===
In January 2016 he signed back with KFÍ until the end of the season. In 10 games Birgir averaged 14.0 points and 9.7 rebounds, helping the club stave off religation.

=== Valur (2016–2018) ===
Birgir joined Valur prior to the 2016–2017 season. The club finished third in Division I and achieved promotion to Úrvalsdeild after defeating Breiðablik and Hamar in the promotion playoffs. The club also had good success in the Icelandic cup, beating three Úrvalsdeild teams before finally bowing out for the eventual champions, KR, in the final four.

=== Álftanes (2019–2020) ===
After missing all the 2018–2019 season due to a concussion, Birgir signed with Álftanes in August 2019. For the season, he averaged 10.1 points and 5.7 rebounds before it was canceled due to the coronavirus pandemic in Iceland.

== National team career ==
In 2006, Birgir played 8 games for Iceland in the U20 European Championship Men (Division B).

Birgir was among the 30 players selected for the Iceland national basketball team training camp for the summer of 2014. He was not among the final 14 players selected for the EuroBasket 2015 qualifier.

== Career statistics ==
=== Icelandic Domestic Leagues ===
Year	Team	GP	GS	MPG	FG%	3P%	FT%	RPG	APG	SPG	BPG	PPG	PIR
2003–2004	KFÍ	2	-	1.5	1.000	.500	-	0.0	0.0	0.0	0.0	1.0	-
2004–2005	KFÍ	20	-	9.1	.333	.000	.688	2.1	0.4	0.4	0.3	1.5	-
2005–2006	KFÍ	17	-	19.4	.500	.000	.544	6.3	0.3	0.9	0.5	8.4	-
2006–2007	Þór Þorlákshöfn	22	-	4.4	.350	.000	.900	0.5	0.0	0.1	0.1	1.0	-
2007–2008	KFÍ	15	-	17.6	.565	.000	.680	4.5	0.4	0.6	0.1	5.8	-
2008–2009	KFÍ	20	16	25.5	.629	.250	.612	8.5	0.9	0.5	0.7	8.8	14.3
2009–2010	Stjarnan	21	0	8.1	.621	.000	.650	2.5	0.1	0.4	0.3	2.3	3.9
2010–2011	Stjarnan	10	0	5.5	.357	.000	.600	3.0	0.5	0.1	0.1	1.3	3.0
2010–2011	Valur	11	2	12.2	.559	.000	.524	4.2	0.4	0.3	0.5	4.5	6.2
2011–2012	Valur	22	16	26.4	.599	.000	.500	7.8	0.8	0.8	0.5	10.6	13.7
2012–2013	Valur	23	21	29.0	.621	.000	.647	9.2	1.0	1.1	0.6	13.5	18.1
2013–2014	Valur	22	22	31.1	.539	.000	.718	9.9	1.2	0.7	1.0	14.0	18.3
2014–2015	KFÍ	21	19	33.5	.520	.333	.736	12.5	1.4	0.9	1.0	17.7	22.3
2015–2016	KFÍ	10	10	29.4	.524	.000	.667	9.7	1.0	1.2	0.5	14.0	17.9
2016–2017	Valur	24	23	29.4	.634	.333	.811	9.0	1.8	0.8	0.8	13.4	20.0
2017–2018	Valur	22	20	18.1	.542	1.000	.625	5.2	0.8	0.4	0.3	5.3	8.8
2019–2020	Álftanes	23	13	22.5	.568	-	.844	5.7	0.5	0.6	0.3	10.1	12.4
