= Guðnason =

Guðnason is an Icelandic patronymic, meaning son of Guðni. In Icelandic names, the name is not strictly a surname because it is not a family name, but a patronymic. Notable people with this name include:

- Guðni Ólafur Guðnason (b. 1965), Icelandic professional basketball player
- Haukur Ingi Guðnason (b. 1978), Icelandic professional football player
- Hilmir Snær Guðnason (b. 1969), Icelandic stage and film actor
