= Joshua Helm =

American basketball player

Personal information
- Born: April 3, 1982 (age 44)
- Listed height: 198 cm (6 ft 6 in)
- Listed weight: 104 kg (229 lb)

Career information
- High school: Grove City (Grove City, Ohio)
- College: Mercyhurst (2000–2004)
- Playing career: 2004–2008
- Position: Forward

Career history
- 2004–2005: KFÍ
- 2005–2006: Rotterdam
- 2006–2007: Donar
- 2007–2008: KR

Career highlights
- Úrvalsdeild Foreign Player of the Year (2005); Úrvalsdeild karla scoring champion (2005); 2× Icelandic All-Star (2005, 2008); Dutch All-Star (2006); Icelandic Super Cup (2007)

Joshua Helm (born April 3, 1982) is an American former professional basketball player. After graduating from Mercyhurst University, he starred in Iceland and the Netherlands, being named All-Star in both countries. In 2005 he was named the Úrvalsdeild Foreign Player of the Year in Iceland after leading the league in scoring with 37.2 points per game.

== College career ==
Helm played college basketball for Mercyhurst University, alongside future Úrvalsdeild star Justin Shouse, where he was a three-time All Great Lakes Intercollegiate Athletic Conference (GLIAC) South Division selection. He was a second-team selection in 2001–02 and 2002–03 and a first-team selection in 2003–04. In 2017, he was inducted in to the school's Hall of Fame.

== Professional career ==
Helm started his career with KFÍ in the Icelandic top-tier Úrvalsdeild karla. He was an instant hit with the team, and led the league in scoring, averaging 37.2 points per game. In January 2005, he was selected to the Icelandic All-Star game where he scored 13 points. In March, he became the tenth player in the Úrvalsdeild history to score 800 points in a single season. After the season he was named the Úrvalsdeild Foreign Player of the Year.

In June 2005, he signed with Rotterdam Basketbal of the Dutch Eredivisie. In February 2006, he was selected to the Dutch All-Star game.

During the 2006–2007 season, Helm played for Donar (then named Hanzevast Capitals for sponsorship reasons).

In 2007, Helm returned to the Úrvalsdeild karla and signed with reigning Icelandic champions KR. On October 7, he scored 25 points and grabbed 19 rebounds in KR's victory against ÍR in the Icelandic Super Cup. In January 2008, he was again selected to the Icelandic All-Star game, this time scoring 9 points. In the Úrvalsdeild, he was one of the best players in the league, averaging 20.8 points and 9.2 rebounds per game and helping KR finish with the second best record during the regular season. In the playoffs, KR unexpectedly lost in the first round to seventh seeded ÍR.

== Titles, awards and achievements ==
=== Titles ===
- Icelandic Super Cup: 2007

=== Awards ===
- Úrvalsdeild Foreign Player of the Year: 2005
- GLIAC South Division All First Team: 2004
- GLIAC South Division All Second Team (2): 2002, 2003

=== Achievements ===
- Úrvalsdeild karla scoring champion: 2005
- Icelandic All-Star (2): 2005, 2008
- Dutch All-Star: 2006
- Mercyhurst University Hall of Fame: 2017
