= Ólafur Jón Ormsson =

Icelandic basketball player (born 1976)

Personal information
- Born: June 21, 1976 (age 50) Reykjavík, Iceland
- Listed height: 1.93 m (6 ft 4 in)

Career information
- Playing career: 1993–2002
- Position: Guard

Career history
- 1993–1996: KR
- 1997–1999: KFÍ
- 1999–2002: KR

Career highlights
- Icelandic Men's Basketball Player of the Year (2000); Úrvalsdeild Domestic Player of the Year (2001); 2x Úrvalsdeild Domestic All-First team (2000, 2001); Icelandic championship (2000)

Career Úrvalsdeild karla statistics
- Points: 2,170 (14.4 ppg)
- Rebounds: 437 (4.0 ppg)
- Games: 151

Ólafur Jón Ormsson (born 21 June 1976) is an Icelandic former basketball player and a former member of Icelandic national team. He played eight seasons in the Úrvalsdeild karla, winning the Icelandic championship with KR in 2000. He was named the Icelandic Men's Basketball Player of the Year that same year.

== Playing career ==
Ólafur played his first senior games with KR during the 1993–1994 Úrvalsdeild season, averaging 9.6 points per game in 22 games. He established himself as one of the top three-point shooters the following season, shooting 42.1% from the three-point range, good for tenth best in the league. He missed half of the 1995–1996 season due to back injures but had a strong finish, averaging 10.7 points while shooting 40.9% from the three-point range in the last 11 games.

After back injuries forced him to miss all of the 1996–1997 season, Ólafur signed with KFÍ during the summer of 1997. He helped KFÍ reach the Icelandic Cup finals in 1998 after scoring 21 points in a victory against Njarðvík in the semi-finals. In the finals, he scored 8 points in KFÍ's 71–95 loss to Grindavík.

He returned to KR in 1999 after two season with KFÍ and led them to the national championship in April 2000 for the first time in 10 years. In December 2000, Ólafur was named the Icelandic Men's Basketball Player of the Year. In 2001 he was named the Úrvalsdeild Domestic Player of the Year after averaging 20.2 points and 6.0 rebounds per game.

His Úrvalsdeild career came to a stop following an injury plagued 2001–2002 season where he missed all but 6 games.

== Icelandic national team ==
Ólafur Jón played six games for the Icelandic national team from 1999 to 2000.

== Personal life ==
Ólafur's daughter is basketball player Kristrún Ríkey Ólafsdóttir.

== Awards and accomplishments ==
=== Titles ===
- Icelandic championship: 2000

=== Individual awards ===
- Icelandic Men's Basketball Player of the Year: 2000
- Úrvalsdeild Domestic Player of the Year: 2001
- Úrvalsdeild Domestic All-First team (2): 2000, 2001
