= Dwayne Fontana =

American basketball player (born 1973)

Personal information
- Born: 21 February 1973 (age 53)
- Listed height: 6 ft 5 in (1.96 m)
- Listed weight: 218 lb (99 kg)

Career information
- High school: Riordan (San Francisco, California)
- College: Arizona State (1990–1994)
- Playing career: 1994–2001
- Position: Forward

Career history
- 2000–2001: KFÍ
- 2001: Baloncesto Alcalá

Career highlights
- Úrvalsdeild karla leading scorer (2001)

Dwayne Lamar Fontana (born 21 February 1973) is an American former basketball player. He played college basketball for Arizona State before going on to play professionally. In 2001, he was the leading scorer of the Icelandic Úrvalsdeild.

== High school career ==
Fontana attended Riordan High in San Francisco where he played basketball.

== College career ==
Fontana played four years for Arizona State, averaging 10.1 points and 5.9 rebounds over his career. During his senior year the University was rocked by a point-shaving scandal involving teammates Hedake Smith and Isaac Burton. He was interviewed in the Netflix series Bad Sport about his teammates' involvement.

== Professional career ==
In September 2000, Fontana signed with Úrvalsdeild karla club KFÍ. On 13 October he scored a season high 48 points against Valur/Fjölnir. On 21 February, he grabbed 15 offensive rebounds against Njarðvík. For the season, Fontana averaged a league leading 33.0 points and 13.9 rebounds per game.

Following his stay in Iceland, Fontana played shortly in Spain and Luxembourg before retiring from basketball.
