= Helgi Rafn Viggósson =

Icelandic basketball player

Personal information
- Born: 14 June 1983 (age 43)
- Listed height: 196 cm (6 ft 5 in)

Career information
- Playing career: 2001–2023
- Position: Power forward / center
- Number: 14

Career history
- 2001–2023: Tindastóll

Career highlights
- Icelandic champion (2023); Icelandic Cup winner (2018); Icelandic Super Cup winner (2018); Icelandic Company Cup winner (2012); 2× 1. deild karla winner (2006, 2014); No. 14 jersey retired by Tindastóll

Career Úrvalsdeild karla statistics
- Points: 3,147 (8.1 ppg)
- Rebounds: 2,404 (6.2 ppg)
- Games: 387

Helgi Rafn Viggósson (born 14 June 1983) is an Icelandic former basketball player. Known for his intensity, he spent his entire career with Tindastóll where he won the Icelandic championship in 2023 and the Icelandic Cup in 2018. He is Tindastóll's all-time leader in games played in the Úrvalsdeild and 7th overall.

Helgi started his senior team career with Tindastóll during the 2001–2002 season. On 24 January 2003, he scored a game winning buzzer beater against Skallagrímur and finished with 12 points and Úrvalsdeild career high 22 rebounds. He missed the majority of the 2004–2005 season due to a motorcycle accident. On 23 October 2009, he scored a Úrvalsdeild career high 36 points against KR. On 26 November 2012, he scored 16 points against Snæfell in Tindastóll's win in the Icelandic Company Cup final. On 13 January 2018, he helped Tindastóll win the Icelandic Cup for the first time in its history. He announced his retirement from basketball following Tindastóll's series clinching win against Valur in the 2023 Úrvalsdeild finals. On 27 October 2023, Tindastóll retired Helgi's number 14 jersey.

== Personal life ==
Helgi's wife is former footballer Hrafnhildur Guðnadóttir. His grandfather was Helgi Rafn Traustason, the founder of Tindastóll's basketball department.
