= Nemanja Knezevic =

Montenegrin and Icelandic basketball player

Höttur
- Position: Center

Personal information
- Born: 20 October 1987 (age 39)
- Listed height: 205 cm (6 ft 9 in)

Career information
- Playing career: 2005–present

Career history
- 2005–2011: KK Vojvodina Novi Sad
- 2011: KK Jedinstvo Bijelo Polje
- 2011–2012: AB Pacense
- 2012–2013: KK Centar Bijelo Polje
- 2013: SL Takovo Leotar
- 2013–2014: KK Centar Bijelo Polje
- 2013–2014: KK Varda Višegrad
- 2013–2014: ABS Primorje 1945
- 2014–2015: Mladost Mrkonjić Grad
- 2015–2017: US Laval
- 2017–2022: Vestri
- 2022–present: Höttur

Career highlights
- 1. deild karla champion (2026); Úrvalsdeild karla rebounding leader (2022); 3× 1. deild karla rebounding leader (2018, 2019, 2021)

Nemanja Knezevic (born 20 October 1987) is a Montenegrin and Icelandic basketball player. Outside of his home country, he has played in Bosnia, France, Iceland, Serbia and Spain. In Iceland, he led the top-tier Úrvalsdeild karla in rebounding during the 2021-2022 season.

== Professional career ==
In 2017, Knezevic joined Vestri in the 1. deild karla. He led the league in rebounds in both 2018 and 2019, while also being in top ten in scoring. In 2019–2020, Knezevic averaged 18.4 points and 13.8 rebounds per game. During the 2020–2021 season, Knezevic averaged 16.5 points and 15.9 rebounds and helped Vestri win the 1. deild promotion playoffs. In his first Úrvalsdeild game, Knezevic postes season highs of 22 points and 3 blocks along with 16 rebounds in a double overtime loss against Keflavík. On 17 February 2022, he posted a triple-double against Tindastóll with 12 points, 19 rebounds and 11 assists. Appearing in all 22 games, he averaged 12.2 points and led the league with 12.1 rebounds per game. Following the season, he stayed in the Úrvalsdeild and signed with newly promoted Höttur.

During his first season with Höttur, he averaged 10.6 points and 9.1 rebounds per game. During his second season, he averaged 9.7 points and 10.9 rebounds, helping Höttur reach the Úrvalsdeild playoffs for the first time in their history. In the playoffs, Knezevic averaged 10.8 points and 12.5 rebounds in Höttur's first round loss to eventual champions Valur.

For the 2024–2025 season, Knezevic averaged 12.3 points and 10.1 rebounds per game, good for third best in the league, but was unable to prevent Höttur from being relegated to the 1. deild karla.
