= Sigurður Þorsteinsson =

Icelandic basketball player

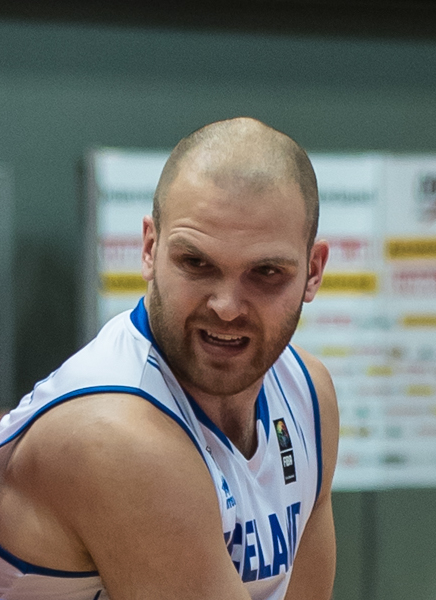

Personal information
- Born: 8 July 1988 (age 38) Ísafjörður, Iceland
- Listed height: 2.05 m (6 ft 9 in)
- Listed weight: 110 kg (243 lb)

Career information
- Playing career: 2001–2024
- Position: Center
- Number: 15

Career history
- 2001–2006: KFÍ
- 2006–2011: Keflavík
- 2011–2014: Grindavík
- 2014–2015: Solna Vikings
- 2015–2016: Machites Doxas Pefkon
- 2016–2017: Gymnastikos Larissa
- 2017–2018: Grindavík
- 2018–2020: ÍR
- 2020–2021: Höttur
- 2021–2023: Tindastóll
- 2023–2024: Vestri

Career highlights
- 7× Úrvalsdeild Domestic All-First Team (2009, 2011–2013, 2019, 2021, 2022); 4× Icelandic League champion (2008, 2012, 2013, 2023); 4× Icelandic Super Cup winner (2008, 2011-2013); Icelandic Basketball Cup winner (2014); Greek A2 Basket League blocks leader (2017); 2× Úrvalsdeild blocks leader (2010, 2019)

Sigurður Gunnar Þorsteinsson (born 8 July 1988) is an Icelandic former basketball player. Nicknamed Ísafjarðartröllið (English: The Ísafjördur Troll), he won the Icelandic championship four times during his career, in 2008, 2012, 2013 and 2023. Outside of Iceland, Sigurður has played professionally in Greece and Sweden.

== Playing career ==
Born and raised in Ísafjörður in the Westfjords of Iceland, he played youth basketball for his hometown team KFÍ before playing for the senior team, first with its B-team in the 2. deild karla and later with the main squad in the top-tier Úrvalsdeild karla. In 2006, he joined Keflavík where he played until 2011 when he joined Grindavík. After winning two national champions in four seasons, he joined the Solna Vikings in 2014.

In September 2015, Sigurður signed with the Greek 2nd Division team Machites Doxas Pefkon, where he averaged 11.9 points and 7.9 rebounds per game.

In August 2016, Sigurður signed with the Greek 2nd Division team A.E.L. 1964.

Sigurður rejoined Grindavík in August 2017. For the season he averaged 12.8 points and 8.8 rebounds. In July 2018 he left the club.

On 17 August 2018, Sigurður signed with ÍR. On 1 April 2019, he scored 16 points in ÍR's victory in game 5 of its first-round playoff series against second seeded Njarðvík. With the victory, ÍR became the third team in the Úrvalsdeild history to come back from a 0–2 deficit and win a best-of-five series. After helping ÍR reach the Úrvalsdeild finals, where it lost to KR, Sigurður was named to the Úrvalsdeild Domestic All-First Team.

In June 2019, Sigurður signed with BC Orchies of the NM1. Two days before the first game of the season, the French Basketball Federation declared that the Orchies did not fulfill their required financial obligations and as a result Sigurður was released from his contract.

On 23 October 2019, Sigurður returned to ÍR, signing a two-year contract. Only 9 minutes into his first game back, he suffered a season ending injury after tearing a cruciate ligament in his knee. After the season, ÍR terminated the contract with Sigurður, leaving him a free agent. In August 2020, Sigurður sued ÍR for missing salary payments and claimed the team owed him over 2 million ISK. ÍR had stopped paying Sigurður his salary after the injury, claiming he was not fulfilling his end of the contract. On 17 November 2020, the District Court of Reykjavík ruled that ÍR owed Sigurður two million ISK in back pays plus penalties.

On 10 June 2020, Sigurður signed with Úrvalsdeild club Höttur. In 22 games, he averaged 12.6 points and 8.0 rebounds per game. Despite his performance, Höttur was relegated after a loss in the last game of the regular season.

On 31 May 2021, Sigurður signed with Tindastóll. On 11 November 2021 he became the 11th player to grab 2,000 career rebounds in the Úrvalsdeild. On 30 April, he had 20 points and 9 rebounds in Tindastóll's game four series deciding victory against Njarðvík in the semi-finals of the Úrvalsdeild playoffs. With the victory, he became the first player to advance to the finals with four different teams. On 9 May, he became the Úrvalsdeild finals all-time leader in blocked shots, breaking Friðrik Erlendur Stefánsson's record of 150 blocks. He helped Tindastóll to the 2022 Úrvalsdeild finals where they lost to Valur 2–3.

In 2023, he won his fourth Icelandic championship after Tindastóll defeated Valur 3–2 in a finals rematch. Following the season, he announced that he would not return to Tindastóll.

In August 2023, Sigurður signed with his hometown team Vestri. Following the season, where Vestri lost in the 2. deild finals, he announced his retirement from basketball.

== Icelandic national team ==
Between 2007 and 2019, Sigurður has played 58 games for the Icelandic men's national team. He did not make the 12 man roster for the FIBA Eurobasket in 2015 and 2017. In May 2019, he was called up to the national team for the first time since July 2017, ahead of the Games of the Small States of Europe.

== Awards and honours ==
=== Club ===
- 3x Icelandic League champion (2008, 2012, 2013)
- 4× Icelandic Super Cup winner (2008, 2011–2013)
- Icelandic Basketball Cup winner (2014)
- 2x Company Cup winner (2006, 2011)

=== Individual ===
- 6x Úrvalsdeild Domestic All-First Team (2009, 2011–2013, 2019, 2021)
- Úrvalsdeild Young Player of the Year (2008)
- 2x Úrvalsdeild blocks leader (2010, 2019)
- Greek A2 Basket League blocks leader (2017)
- Icelandic Cup MVP (2014)
