= Birgir Örn Birgisson =

Icelandic basketball coach and former player

Personal information
- Born: 6 October 1969 (age 57) Ísafjörður, Iceland
- Listed height: 196 cm (6 ft 5 in)
- Listed weight: 100 kg (220 lb)

Career information
- Playing career: 1990–2026
- Position: Forward / center
- Number: 11, 34, 69
- Coaching career: 2003–2026

Career history

Playing
- 1990–1991: Bolungarvík
- 1991–1996: Þór Akureyri
- 1996–1999: Keflavík
- 1999–2000: Stuttgart Feuerbach
- 2000–2001: Keflavík
- 2001–2006: SG Sechtem
- 2014–2016: KFÍ
- 2017–2021: Vestri-b
- 2022–2026: Vestri

Coaching
- 2003–2006: SG Sechtem
- 2010: BG Bonn MTUs
- 2012–2013: Telekom Baskets Bonn
- 2013–2016: KFÍ
- 2017–2019: Vestri-b
- 2024–2026: Vestri

Career highlights
- As player: 2× Icelandic league champion (1997, 1999); Icelandic Cup winner (1997); Icelandic Super Cup winner (1997); Icelandic Division I winner (1994)

Birgir Örn Birgisson (born 6 October 1969) is an Icelandic basketball coach and a former professional player who played 26 games for the Icelandic national basketball team. He won two national championships with Keflavík in 1997 and 1999. Before turning to basketball, Birgir had a successful career in swimming and was a member of the Icelandic national swimming team.

== Basketball ==
Following his swimming career, Birgir took up basketball with Bolungarvík in 1990 at the age of 21. After one season, he transferred to Þór Akureyri where he played for five seasons and was selected to the Icelandic national basketball team for the first time. In 1996, he joined Keflavík where he won the national championship in 1997 and 1999 as well as the Icelandic Cup in 1997. In 1999, he moved to Germany where he played and coached, aside from the 2001–2002 season, until 2014 when he moved to his hometown of Ísafjörður to coach KFÍ (later known as Vestri). In 2022, at the age of 53, he made a comeback with Vestri in the third-tier 2. deild karla.

=== Awards and achievements ===
- Icelandic champion: 2
  - 1997, 1999
- Icelandic Division I: 1
  - 1994
- Icelandic Basketball Cup: 1
  - 1997
- Icelandic Supercup: 1
  - 1997
- Icelandic Company Cup: 3
  - 1996, 1997, 1998

=== National team ===
Birgir played 26 games for the Icelandic national basketball team between 1995 and 2000.

== Swimming ==
=== Awards and achievements ===
- Icelandic Swim Cup: 1
  - 1986
