= Sean Gibson =

American basketball player (born 1971)

Personal information
- Born: August 3, 1971 (age 55)
- Listed height: 6 ft 7 in (2.01 m)
- Listed weight: 225 lb (102 kg)

Career information
- High school: Floyd Central (Floyds Knobs, Indiana)
- College: IPFW (1989–1993)
- Playing career: 1993–1998
- Position: Power forward / center

Career history
- 1994–1995: KFÍ
- 1995–1996: CB Mollet
- 1996–1997: Viajes Aliguer
- 1997–1998: CB Breogán
- 1998: Viajes Aliguer
- 1998: CDU Católica

Career highlights
- GLVC champion (1993); GLVC Player of the Year (1993); GLVC All-First Team (1992, 1993); Icelandic D2 champion (1994)

Sean Gibson (born August 31, 1971) is an American former basketball player. He played college basketball for Indiana University – Purdue University Fort Wayne before playing professionally in Spain, Iceland, Chile and the Dominican Republic.

== High school ==
Gibson attended Floyd Central High School in Floyds Knobs, Indiana where he played basketball alongside his brother, Shane Gibson.

== College career ==
Gibson played for four years at Indiana University – Purdue University Fort Wayne and left the school as its all-team leader in points and rebounds.

== Professional career ==
In 1994, Gibson joined KFÍ ahead of the 2. deild karla playoffs and helped the team win all its games and gain promotion to the 1.deild karla. He re-signed with the team the following season and gained national attention for his performances in the league after averaging close to 40 points and 17 rebounds. In the Icelandic Cup he scored 51 points against Úrvalsdeild club Tindastóll, making 19 of 20 free throws, in KFÍ's 86–80 loss.

He spent the 1996–1997 season in Spain with Viajes Aliguer.

== Titles and awards ==
=== Titles ===
- 2. deild karla winner (1994)
- Great Lakes Valley Conference winner (1993)

=== Awards ===
- Great Lakes Valley Conference Player of the Year (1993)
- Great Lakes Valley Conference All-First Team (1992, 1993)
- Purdue Fort Wayne Hall of Fame
