= Jón Oddsson =

Icelandic multi-sport athlete

Jón Halldór Oddsson
Personal information
- Date of birth: 25 January 1958 (age 68)
- Place of birth: Ísafjörður, Iceland
- Position: Striker

Senior career*
Years	Team	Apps	(Gls)
1978	ÍBÍ		
1979–1980	KR		
1981–1983	ÍBÍ		
1984	Breiðablik		
1985–1986	ÍBÍ		
1987	Fram	3	(0)
1988–1989	Víkingur	16	(0)
1990	Einherji		

International career
1979	Iceland	1	(0)
- * Club domestic league appearances and goals

Jón Halldór Oddsson (born 25 January 1958) is an Icelandic former multi-sport athlete. He was a member of both the Icelandic men's national football team and the Icelandic track and field national team.

== Athletics ==
Jón competed in track and field from the age of 18 until the age of 39, winning several Icelandic championships in long jump, triple jump, high jump, pentathlon and relay racing. He was first noticed on the national stage when he competed in the Meistaramót Íslands in 1978 where he medaled in long jump and triple Jump.

== Football ==
Jón played for several seasons in the Icelandic top-tier football league, then named 1. deild karla. In 1979, while playing for KR, he was the fifth highest goal scorer ins the 1. deild with 8 goals.

=== National football team ===
In May 1979, Jón was named to the Icelandic men's national football team. On May 22, he was an unused substitute in Iceland's UEFA Euro 1980 qualifying game against Swiss. On May 26, he played his first and only game when he came on 59th minute in Iceland's 1–3 loss against West Germany.

== Basketball ==
Jón Oddsson
- Position: Shooting guard

Career history
- 197?–1978: KFÍ
- 1978–1979: ÍS
- 1979: Valur
- 1980: KFÍ
- 1980–1981: ÍS
- 1982–1983: KFÍ
- 1986–1987: ÍS
- 1989–1990: UMFB
- 1991–1992: Víkverji
- 1992–1993: UMFB
- 1994–1996: ÍH
- 2008–2009: KFÍ

Jón played three seasons in the Icelandic top-tier Úrvalsdeild karla, winning the Icelandic championship and Icelandic Basketball Cup in 1980 as a member of Valur. He played for several seasons in the lower leagues. On March 6, 2009, he played his last game at the age of 50, in the second-tier 1. deild karla.

== Personal life ==
Jón is married to Martha Ernstdóttir who competed in women's marathon at the 2000 Summer Olympics.

== See also ==
- List of Iceland international footballers
