= Guðni Ólafur Guðnason =

Icelandic basketball player and coach

Personal information
- Born: 14 December 1965 (age 60) Iceland
- Listed height: 6 ft 2 in (1.88 m)
- Listed weight: 190 lb (86 kg)

Career information
- College: Wisconsin–Oshkosh (1988-1989)
- Playing career: 1983–2007
- Position: Guard / forward
- Coaching career: 1990–2016

Career history

Playing
- 1983–1994: KR
- 1994–1996: ÍS
- 1996–2002: KFÍ
- 2001–2005: → KFÍ-b
- 2006–2007: KFÍ

Coaching
- 1990–1992: KR (Women's)
- 1994–1996: ÍS (Men's)
- 1996–1998: KFÍ (Men's)
- 2002: KFÍ (Women's)
- 2016: KFÍ (Men's)

Career highlights
- Icelandic Basketball Player of the Year (1986); Úrvalsdeild Domestic All-First team (1988); Úrvalsdeild Young Player of the Year (1984); Icelandic champion (1990); 2× Icelandic Basketball Cup (1984, 1991)

Career Úrvalsdeild karla playing statistics
- Points: 3,494 (13.8 ppg)
- Games: 253

Career coaching record
- Úrvalsdeild karla: 22–22 (.500)
- Úrvalsdeild kvenna: 7–30 (.189)
Medals
Men's basketball
Representing Iceland
Games of the Small States of Europe
Bronze medal – third place	1989 Cyprus	National Team
Gold medal – first place	1991 Andorra	National Team
FIBA European Championship for Small Countries
Gold medal – first place	1988 Malta	National Team
Gold medal – first place	1990 Wales	National Team

Guðni Ólafur Guðnason (born 14 December 1965) is an Icelandic former basketball player and coach who played 76 games for the Icelandic national team. In 1986 he was named the Icelandic Basketball Player of the Year. As a member of KR, he won the Icelandic championship once and the Icelandic Basketball Cup twice.

== Playing career ==
=== College ===
Guðni spent part of the 1988-1989 season with University of Wisconsin–Oshkosh but left the school in late January 1989 and returned to KR in Iceland.

=== KR ===
He started his career with KR and spent 11 years there, winning the Icelandic championship in 1990, and the Icelandic Cup in 1984 and 1991.

In 1984, Guðni lead the Úrvalsdeild in free throw percent and was named as the Úrvalsdeild Young Player of the Year. In 1986 he was named the Icelandic Basketball Player of the Year and in 1988 to the Úrvalsdeild Domestic All-First Team.

=== ÍS ===
In 1994 he signed with 1. deild karla club ÍS as a player-coach and led them to a 16-4 record, good for the best record in the league. The team knocked out Þór Þorlákshöfn 3-2 in the first round of the playoffs before losing 0-2 to Breiðablik in the Finals. During the 1995-96 season he led ÍS to an 11-5 record and a third-place finish. ÍS got knocked out by eventual champions, KFÍ, 0-2 in the first round of the playoffs.

=== KFÍ ===
In 1996 he took over freshly promoted KFÍ as a player-coach. In his first season, he led the team to a 9-13 record in the Úrvalsdeild, and just missed the playoffs by a tie-breaker. He averaged 11.6 points on a 61.3% shooting. During his second season KFÍ achieved a fifth-place finish with a 13-9 record but lost in the first round of the playoffs to eventual champions Njarðvík, 2-3. KFÍ also made it to the Icelandic Cup final where it lost to Grindavík, 71-95.

Guðni stepped down as coach and semi-retired as player after that season, only playing a handful of games when injuries plagued the main squad. He did however play for the KFÍ B-team in the Division II, leading them regularly to regional championships and B-team national playoff. He appeared in three league games during the 2006-2007 season, with his best game coming against Valur where he scored 6 points in 7 minutes, and one game in the Icelandic Cup against Keflavík where he also netted 6 points.

Guðni scored 3,494 points in 253 games with KR and KFÍ in the Úrvalsdeild, which makes him 19th on the all-time scoring list.

== National team career ==
From 1985 to 1992, Guðni played 76 games for the Icelandic national team.

== Coaching career ==
Guðni coached Division I club ÍS from 1994-1996 and led them to 27-9 record and two playoffs berths. In 1996 he took over newly promoted KFÍ in the Icelandic Úrvalsdeild. The team achieved a 9-13 record but missed out on the playoffs on the last day of the season. In his second season at the reins of the club the team posted a 13-9 record, good for fifth place in the league. In the playoffs the team lost to eventual champions Njarðvík 3-1 in the first round. They did however achieve success in the Icelandic cup, beating out powerhouses Keflavík and Njarðvík in the early rounds before losing to Grindavík in the cup final game.

In February 2016, Guðni returned to the sideline when he took over as head coach of KFÍ along with Neil Shiran Þórisson after Birgir Örn Birgisson resigned as coach.

== Personal life ==
Guðni is the son of former Icelandic international Guðni Ólafur Guðnason Sr. and the husband of Sólveig Pálsdóttir who played 13 national games for Iceland.
