= Ágúst Herbert Guðmundsson =

Icelandic basketball coach and player (1967–2021)

Personal information
- Born: 26 August 1967 Patreksfjörður, Iceland
- Died: 1 January 2021 (aged 53)
- Coaching career: 1998–2001

Career history

Playing
- 198?–1985: Þór Akureyri
- 1986–1988: Þór Akureyri
- 1989–1992: Þór Akureyri

Coaching
- 1998–2001: Þór Akureyri (men's)

Career coaching record
- Úrvalsdeild karla: 21–45 (.318)

Ágúst Herbert Guðmundsson (26 August 1967 – 1 January 2021) was an Icelandic basketball coach and player.

== Early life ==
Ágúst was born in Patreksfjörður, Iceland but moved at a young age to Hafnarfjörður where he started playing basketball with Haukar's junior teams. He later moved to Akureyri and played several seasons with Þór Akureyri.

== Coaching career ==
Ágúst was the head coach of Þór Akureyri from 1998 to 2001. He continued to coach the club's junior teams until 2017.

== Death ==
In 2017, Ágúst was diagnosed with Motor neuron disease. He died from the illness on 1 January 2021.

== Personal life ==
Ágúst was married to Guðrún Gísladóttir with whom he had three children, including basketball player Júlíus Orri Ágústsson.
