= Keith Vassell =

Canadian-Icelandic basketball player and coach

Personal information
- Born: July 28, 1971 (age 55) Scarborough, Ontario
- Listed height: 195 cm (6 ft 5 in)
- Listed weight: 102 kg (225 lb)

Career information
- High school: Mother Teresa Catholic (Scarborough, Ontario)
- College: Brandon (1991–1996)
- Playing career: 1996–2007
- Position: Forward
- Number: 4, 5, 10, 12
- Coaching career: 1998–present

Career history

Playing
- 1996-1997: Viña Costeira Verín
- 1997–1998: Winnipeg Cyclone
- 1998–2002: KR
- 2002–2003: Hamar
- 2003: KTP Basket
- 2004: Porvoon Tarmo
- 2004: Benetton Fribourg Olympic
- 2004: JSF Nanterre
- 2004–2005: Jämtland Basket
- 2005: C.F. Os Belenenses
- 2005–2006: Union Neuchâtel
- 2006: Fjölnir
- 2007: ÍR

Coaching
- 1998–1999: KR (men's)
- 2001–2002: KR (women's)
- 2006: Fjölnir
- 2008–2010: Brandon University
- 2014–2017: Niagara College
- 2017: Niagara River Lions
- 2017–2018: London Lightning
- 2019–2022: Durham College (assistant)
- 2022: Newfoundland Growlers (assistant)

Career highlights
- As player: Úrvalsdeild karla champion (2000); Icelandic Cup (2007); Icelandic Super Cup (2000); Flagbearer Summer Universiade Fukuoka (1995); CIS Champion (1996); CIS Championship Tournament MVP (1996); CIS Player of the Year (1995); CIS Rookie of the Year (1991); As coach: NBL champion (2018); Icelandic Women's champion (2002); Icelandic Women's Cup winner (2002)
Medals
Representing Canada
FIBA AmeriCup
Silver medal – second place	1999 San Juan	National team
Universiade
Silver medal – second place	1993 Buffalo	National team
Bronze medal – third place	1995 Fukuoka	National team

Keith Christophe Vassell (born 28 July 1971) is a Canadian-Icelandic basketball coach and a former member of the Canadian national basketball team. He played seven seasons in the Icelandic Úrvalsdeild karla, winning the national championship in 2000 with KR and the Icelandic Cup in 2007 with Íþróttafélag Reykjavíkur.

== Playing career ==
=== College career ===
Vassell played college basketball for Brandon University. Over his college career he was a CIS Player of The Year (1995), CIS Rookie of the Year(1991), Three times CIS All-Canadian (1993–1996), 5 time GPAC conference 1st Team All-Star (1991–96). In 1996, he led the school to the CIS championship and was named as the tournament MVP.

=== Club career ===
After spending his first professional season in Spain with Viña Costeira, Vassell signed with KR of the Icelandic Úrvalsdeild karla in January 1998. He spent four and a half seasons with the club, winning the national championship in 2000.

He joined Hamar in the Úrvalsdeild in December 2003. During the season, he was granted Icelandic citizenship.

He split the 2003–2004 season with KTP Basket and Porvoon Tarmo in the Korisliiga, averaging 14.9 points in 31 games. In November 2005, he signed with Jämtland Basket of the Swedish Basketligan. After Jämtland was knocked out in the playoffs, Vassell signed with C.F. Os Belenenses in the Liga Portuguesa de Basquetebol. He spent the 2005–2006 season with Union Neuchâtel in the SB League, averaging 13.6 points in 22 games.

In 2006, Vassell returned to Iceland and signed as a player-coach for Fjölnir. He was fired midseason but signed with ÍR to finish out the season as a player. In February 2007, he helped ÍR to the Icelandic Cup finals where they beat Hamar/Selfoss 83–81. In 10 regular season games for ÍR, Vassell averaged 9.7 points and 5.5 rebounds but upped those averages to 15.7 points and 5.7 rebounds in the playoffs.

=== National team career ===
Vassell played for 11 years for the Canadian national basketball teams.

== Coaching career ==
Vassell's first coaching stint was with KR men's team in 1998–1999. He coached KR women's team for the 2001–2002 season, winning both the Icelandic championship and the Icelandic Cup. In 2006 he was hired as the head coach of Fjölnir. In December that year, he was fired and replaced by Bárður Eyþórsson.

Vassell's next coaching job was to coach at his alma mater, Brandon University, from 2008 to 2010, winning the GPAC division and getting to Canada West Final Four. They also won the Wesman Classic at Christmas time.

Vassell served as the head coach of Niagara College Knights men's basketball team from 2014 to 2017, amassing a 34–19 record and back-to-back fourth-place finishes at the OCAA Championship.

On March 11, 2017, the Niagara River Lions' head coach Grâce Lokole stepped down from his position and became the assistant coach. The team named Vassell as the interim head coach to finish the season.

In August 2017, Vassell was hired as the head coach of London Lightning of the National Basketball League of Canada. In 2018, he guided the Lightning to the NBL championship. After a 4–4 start the 2018–19 NBL Canada season, the Lightning fired Vassell.

In September 2019, Vassell was hired as an assistant coach to Durham Lords men's basketball team.
