= 1997–98 Úrvalsdeild karla =

DHL deild karla^{1}
- Duration: October 2, 1997 – April 19, 1998
- Teams: 12

Regular season
- Top seed: Grindavík
- Relegated: ÍR

Finals
- Champions: Njarðvík (14th title)
- Runners-up: KR
- Semifinalists: ÍA, Keflavík

Awards
- Domestic MVP: (Iceland) Helgi Jónas Guðfinnsson
- Foreign MVP: (United States) David Bevis

Statistical leaders
Points	(United States) Darryl Wilson	33.3
Rebounds	(United States) Jesse Ratliff	18.4
Assists	(United States) Warren Peebles	8.1
- ^{1} Sponsored league name, referring to Úrvalsdeild karla.

The 1997–98 Úrvalsdeild karla was the 46th season of the Úrvalsdeild karla, the top tier men's basketball league on Iceland. The season started on October 2, 1997 and ended on April 19, 1998. Njarðvík won its fourteenth title by defeating KR 3–0 in the Finals.

== Competition format ==
The participating teams first played a conventional round-robin schedule with every team playing each opponent once "home" and once "away" for a total of 22 games. The top eight teams qualified for the championship playoffs whilst the bottom team was relegated to Division 1.

== Regular season ==
Pos	Team	Pld	W	L	PF	PA	PD	Pts	Qualification or relegation
1	Grindavík	22	19	3	1990	1761	+229	38	Qualification to playoffs
2	KR	22	14	8	1834	1791	+43	28	Qualification to playoffs
3	Haukar	22	14	8	1840	1661	+179	28	Qualification to playoffs
4	Njarðvík	22	14	8	1984	1788	+196	28	Qualification to playoffs
5	KFÍ	22	13	9	1880	1803	+77	26	Qualification to playoffs
6	Keflavík	22	13	9	1963	1876	+87	26	Qualification to playoffs
7	Tindastóll	22	13	9	1728	1656	+72	26	Qualification to playoffs
8	ÍA	22	11	11	1671	1701	−30	22	Qualification to playoffs
9	Skallagrímur	22	9	13	1821	1920	−99	18	
10	Valur	22	5	17	1796	1945	−149	10	
11	Þór Akureyri	22	4	18	1739	2071	−332	8	
12	ÍR	22	3	19	1707	1980	−273	6	Relegated

== Playoffs ==
Quarterfinals
1	Grindavík	1
8	ÍA	2
2	KR	2
7	Tindastóll	1
(Pairings are reseeded after the first round)
3	Haukar	0
6	Keflavík	2
4	Njarðvík	2
5	KFÍ	1

Semifinals
2	KR	3
8	ÍA	1
4	Njarðvík	3
6	Keflavík	1

Finals
2	KR	0
4	Njarðvík	3
