= Ray Carter (basketball) =

British-American basketball player

Personal information
- Born: September 12, 1972 (age 54)
- Listed height: 188 cm (6 ft 2 in)

Career information
- High school: Leon (Tallahassee, Florida)
- College: Central Florida (1991–1993); Rollins (1994–1996)
- Position: Guard

Career history
- 1996–1997: Brandt Hagen E.V.
- 1998–1999: Oberwart Gunners
- 1999: KFÍ
- 1999: Manchester Giants
- 2000: SSV ratiopharm Ulm

Career highlights
- Austrian Cup winner (1999)

Raymond Howard Carter (born September 12, 1972) is a British-American former professional basketball player and a former member of the English national basketball team.

== College ==
Carter played for Central Florida from 1991 to 1993 but poor grades cost him his eligibility at UCF. He started 14 games as a freshman and 15 games as a junior, averaging 9.5 points and making 102 of 310 3-point shots during his two years at UCF. He enrolled at Valencia Community College in the spring of 1993 to repair his grade point. In 1994 Carter joined Rollins College where he graduated in 1996.

== Career ==
Carter played for Brandt Hagen E.V. during the 1996–1997 season. He averaged 12.0 points and 4.0 assists for the club in the 1996–97 FIBA EuroCup.

Carter played for the Oberwart Gunners during the 1998–1999 season and helped them win the Austrian Cup. He left the club in January 1999 after the escalation of a dispute which began when the club deducted wages for time he spent with the English national team. In February 1999, Carter signed with KFÍ of the Úrvalsdeild karla. With Carter, KFÍ won five of their last six games and finished with the third best record in the regular season. During the playoffs, they swept Tindastóll 2–0 in the first round before bowing out against Njarðvík, 1–3, in the semi-finals.
