= Craig Schoen =

American-born basketball player

Personal information
- Born: May 2, 1983 (age 43) Elizabeth, Indiana
- Listed height: 5 ft 11 in (1.80 m)
- Listed weight: 185 lb (84 kg)

Career information
- High school: South Central (Elizabeth, Indiana)
- College: Lipscomb (2002–2003); Kentucky Wesleyan (2003–2005); Georgetown (Kentucky) (2005–2007)
- Playing career: 2007–2012
- Position: Point guard

Career history
- 2008: Southern Indiana Generals
- 2008–2012: KFÍ

Career highlights
- 2× Icelandic D1 champion (2010, 2012); 2× Icelandic D1 assist leader (2010, 2012); Icelandic D1 steals leader (2010); 2× MSC All-Conference (2006, 2007)

Craig Alan Schoen (born May 2, 1983) is a former American professional basketball player.

== High school ==
Schoen attended South Central Junior & Senior High School in Elizabeth, Indiana. He scored 1,922 career points at South Central where he graduated from in 2002.

== College ==
Schoen started his college career with the Lipscomb Bisons in 2002 where he averaged six points and team high four assists per game. After his freshman year, he transferred to Kentucky Wesleyan. He averaged 12 points and 4 assists during the 2003–2004 season but was redshirted the following season as KWC was given a one-year postseason tournament ban by the Great Lakes Valley Conference. In the summer of 2005, he left KWC after receiving a scholarship from Georgetown College in Kentucky. During his two seasons there, he was voted to Mid-South Conference All-Conference team in 2006 and 2007.

== Iceland ==
Schoen joined KFÍ in the Icelandic Division I for the 2008–09 season. He went on to lead the team in scoring (28.9 ppg) and assists (5.0) while guiding them to a playoff seat where they would eventually lose to Valur 1–2. During the 2009–10 season, Schoen averaged 21.7 points and league leading 6.8 assists while helping the team achieve first place and promotion to the Úrvalsdeild karla.

Schoen averaged 17.8 points, 4.3 rebounds and 5.0 assists for the 2010–2011 season but KFÍ finished with a 5–17 record and were relegated back to Division I. He returned to KFÍ for 2011–12 season and was instrumental in leading the team to a league best 17–1 record and promotion back to the Úrvalsdeild karla. For the season he averaged 16.6 points, 5.5 rebounds and league leading 7.4 assists.

== Career statistics ==
=== Regular season ===
Year	Team	GP	GS	MPG	FG%	3P%	FT%	RPG	APG	SPG	BPG	PPG
2008–09	KFÍ	20	20	35.6	.585	.436	.843	5.6	5.0	3.1	0.2	28.9
2009–10	KFÍ	18	18	34.5	.664	.377	.885	4.0	6.8	3.5	0.2	21.7
2010–11	KFÍ	21	21	34.3	.474	.407	.885	4.0	5.0	2.9	0.3	17.8
2011–12	KFÍ	17	17	33.0	.564	.383	.794	5.5	7.4	2.9	0.3	16.6

== Personal life ==
Schoen's sister, Brittany, played college basketball for Indiana State and professionally in Iceland. His older brothers, Chad and Scott, played college basketball for Georgetown College.
