= Dominique Elliott =

American basketball player (born 1991)

Personal information
- Born: November 11, 1991 (age 35) Garden City, Georgia
- Listed height: 6 ft 8 in (2.03 m)
- Listed weight: 260 lb (118 kg)

Career information
- High school: Center Grove (Greenwood, Indiana)
- College: Maryland Eastern Shore (2012–2016)
- Playing career: 2016–present
- Position: Power forward

Career history
- 2016–2017: Krka
- 2017: Lions de Genève
- 2018: Keflavík
- 2018: Feni Industries
- 2018–19: Cactus Tbilisi
- 2019: Rapla

Career highlights
- Slovenian Supercup (2016)

Dominique Elliott (born November 11, 1991) is an American professional basketball player. He played college basketball at the Maryland.

== Playing career ==
Elliott started his professional career with KK Krka of the Premier A Slovenian Basketball League and the ABA League in 2016. In 2017, he signed with Swiss Basketball League club Lions de Genève.

On January 2, 2018, Úrvalsdeild club Keflavík announced they had signed Elliott in place of recently released Stanley Robinson.
