= 1996–97 Úrvalsdeild karla =

DHL deild karla^{1}
- Duration: October 3, 1996 – April 6, 1997
- Teams: 12

Regular season
- Top seed: Keflavík
- Relegated: Breiðablik

Finals
- Champions: Keflavík (4th title)
- Runners-up: Grindavík
- Semifinalists: KR, Njarðvík

Awards
- Domestic MVP: (Iceland) Hermann Hauksson
- Foreign MVP: (United States) Damon Johnson

Statistical leaders
Points	(United States) Andre Bovain	35.1
Rebounds	(United States) Fred Elmore Williams	16.1
Assists	(Iceland) Jón Kr. Gíslason	8.6
- ^{1} Sponsored league name, referring to Úrvalsdeild karla.

The 1996–97 Úrvalsdeild karla was the 45th season of the Úrvalsdeild karla, the top tier men's basketball league on Iceland. The season started on October 3, 1996 and ended on April 6, 1997. Keflavík won its fourth title by defeating Grindavík 3–0 in the Finals.

== Competition format ==
The participating teams first played a conventional round-robin schedule with every team playing each opponent once "home" and once "away" for a total of 22 games. The top eight teams qualified for the championship playoffs whilst the bottom team was relegated to Division 1.

== Regular season ==
Pos	Team	Pld	W	L	PF	PA	PD	Pts	Qualification or relegation
1	Keflavík	22	19	3	2220	1826	+394	38	Qualification to playoffs
2	Grindavík	22	17	5	2048	1917	+131	34	Qualification to playoffs
3	ÍA	22	15	7	1759	1673	+86	30	Qualification to playoffs
4	Haukar	22	15	7	1872	1798	+74	30	Qualification to playoffs
5	Njarðvík	22	13	9	1867	1816	+51	26	Qualification to playoffs
6	KR	22	11	11	1926	1833	+93	22	Qualification to playoffs
7	Skallagrímur	22	10	12	1810	1875	−65	20	Qualification to playoffs
8	ÍR	22	9	13	1884	1883	+1	18	Qualification to playoffs
9	KFÍ	22	9	13	1818	1873	−55	18	
10	Tindastóll	22	7	15	1808	1946	−138	14	
11	Þór Akureyri	22	6	16	1792	1979	−187	12	
12	Breiðablik	22	1	21	1579	1964	−385	2	Relegated

== Playoffs ==
Quarterfinals
1	Keflavík	2
8	ÍR	0
2	Grindavík	2
7	Skallagrímur	0
(Pairings are reseeded after the first round)
3	ÍA	0
6	KR	2
4	Haukar	0
5	Njarðvík	2

Semifinals
1	Keflavík	3
6	KR	1
2	Grindavík	3
5	Njarðvík	0

Finals
1	Keflavík	3
2	Grindavík	0
