= Hrafn Kristjánsson =

Icelandic basketball player and coach

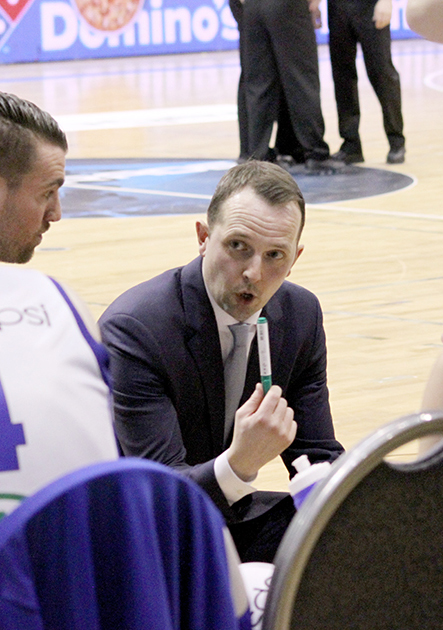
- Hrafn coaching Stjarnan at the 2015 Icelandic Cup finals.

Breiðablik
- Title: Head coach
- League: 1. deild karla

Personal information
- Born: 30 October 1972 (age 54)

Career information
- High school: Kirtland Central (Kirtland, New Mexico)
- Playing career: 1988–2015
- Position: Point guard
- Number: 10
- Coaching career: 2001–present

Career history

Playing
- 1988–1990: KR
- 1991–1994: KR
- 1994–1997: KFÍ
- 1997–1998: Hamar
- 1998–2003: KFÍ
- 2003–2004: KFÍ-b
- 2015: KFÍ-b

Coaching
- 2001–2004: KFÍ (men's)
- 2003–2004: KFÍ (women's)
- 2004–2009: Þór Akureyri (men's)
- 2009–2010: Breiðablik (men's)
- 2010–2011: KR (women's)
- 2010–2012: KR (men's)
- 2014–2018: Stjarnan (men's)
- 2018–2022: Álftanes (men's)
- 2024–present: Breiðablik (men's)

Career highlights
- As player: Icelandic champion (1990); 2× 1. deild karla champion (1996, 2003); 1. deild karla All-First Team (1998); As coach: Icelandic champion (2011); 2× Icelandic Basketball Cup (2011, 2015); Icelandic Company Cup champion (2015); 2× 1. deild karla champion (2003, 2005, 2007); 2. deild karla champion (2019); Úrvalsdeild Coach of the Year (2011); KKÍ All-Star Game head coach (2011)

Hrafn Kristjánsson is an Icelandic basketball coach and former player. He was named the Úrvalsdeild Coach of the Year in the 2010–11 season, when he won the Icelandic championship with the KR. As a coach he has won the Icelandic Basketball Cup two times (2011, 2015) and Icelandic Division I three times (2003, 2005, 2007).

As a player he played 139 games in the Úrvalsdeild with KR and KFÍ, winning the national championship in 1990.

== Playing career ==
Hrafn came up through the junior ranks of KR. He played his first games with the senior team during the 1988–1989 Úrvalsdeild season. The following season he appeared in 5 games for which went on to win the 1990 Icelandic championship. In 1994 he left KR and joined 1. deild karla club KFÍ. In 1996 he helped the team to win 1. deild karla and gain a promotion to the Úrvalsdeild karla for the first time in its history. He played for KFÍ until 2003, except for the 1997–1998 which he spent with Hamar. He finished his playing career with KFÍ's B-team.

== Coaching career ==
=== KFÍ (2001–04) ===
Hrafn took over as player/coach for KFÍ in 2001 after the team had been relegated to Division I. The team won Division I in 2003 and got promoted to the Úrvalsdeild karla.

=== Þór Akureyri (2004–09) ===
Þór Akureyri hired Hrafn as their head coach before the 2004–2005 season. He coached the team for 5 years and won Division I two times (2005 and 2007).

=== Breiðablik (2009–10) ===
Hrafn took charge of Úrvalsdeild karla club Breiðablik in 2009. In January 2010, with the team in last place, he resigned as coach.

=== KR (2010–12) ===
During the summer of 2010, Hrafn was hired as the head coach of KR women's team. In August 2010, he was also hired as the head coach of KR men's team. He led the men's team to the Icelandic Cup and the Icelandic championship in his first year. After the first season, he stepped down as the head coach of the women's team to focus on the men's team. In July 2012, he left KR after contract negotiations between him and KR where not fruitful.

=== Stjarnan (2014–18) ===
In 2014 Hrafn was hired as the head coach of Stjarnan. In January 2015 he led the club to the Icelandic Cup. In October 2015 he won the Icelandic Company Cup after Stjarnan beat Þór Þorlákshöfn 72-58 in the final. On 27 March 2018, after Stjarnan's first round exit against ÍR, the club announced that it had decided not to renew his contract.

=== Álftanes (2018–2022) ===
On 20 July 2018 Hrafn was hired as the head coach of newly promoted 2. deild karla club Álftanes. Álftanes started the 2. deild season with a bang, thrashing former 1. deild karla club Körfuknattleiksfélag ÍA with 64 points, 136-72. On 16 April 2019, Álftanes defeated ÍA in the 2. deild karla finals, 123-100, and achieved promotion to the 1. deild karla.

Hrafn announced his retirement from coaching in April 2022 following Álftanes' loss against Höttur in the 1. deild promotion playoffs.

=== Breiðablik (2024–present) ===
In May 2024, Hrafn returned to coaching, taking over as head coach of Breiðablik along with his son, Mikael Máni Hrafnsson.
