= Þór Akureyri (men's basketball) =

- Founded: 1966
- History: Þór Akureyri; 1966–present
- Arena: Höllin
- Location: Akureyri, Iceland
- Team colors: Red, White
- Website: thorsport.is
Home	Away

The Þór Akureyri men's basketball team, commonly known as Þór Akureyri, is the men's basketball department of Þór Akureyri multi sports club, based in the town of Akureyri in Iceland.

== Season by season ==
Season	Tier	League	Pos.	W–L	Playoffs	Icelandic Cup
1967	2	1. deild karla	1st	3–0	N/A	
1968	1	Úrvalsdeild karla	3th	4–6	N/A	
1969	1	Úrvalsdeild karla	4th	3–7	N/A	
1970	1	Úrvalsdeild karla	6th	2–8	N/A	
1971	1	Úrvalsdeild karla	4th	5–7	N/A	
1972	1	Úrvalsdeild karla	6th	5–9	N/A	
1973	1	Úrvalsdeild karla	8th	1–13	N/A	
Lower leagues
1977–78	1	Úrvalsdeild karla	6th	4–10	N/A	
1978–79	1	Úrvalsdeild karla	6th	3–17	N/A	
Lower leagues
1987–88	1	Úrvalsdeild karla	8th	2–14	DNQ	
1988–89	1	Úrvalsdeild karla	9th	3–23	DNQ	
1989–90	1	Úrvalsdeild karla	9th	6–20	DNQ	
1990–91	1	Úrvalsdeild karla	7th	7–19	DNQ	
1991–92	1	Úrvalsdeild karla	10th	2–24	DNQ	
Lower leagues
1994–95	1	Úrvalsdeild karla	4th	18–14	1st round	
1995–96	1	Úrvalsdeild karla	9th	9–23	DNQ	
1996–97	1	Úrvalsdeild karla	11th	6–16	DNQ	
1997–98	1	Úrvalsdeild karla	11th	4–18	DNQ	
1998–99	1	Úrvalsdeild karla	10th	5–17	DNQ	
1999–00	1	Úrvalsdeild karla	7th	10–12	1st round	
2000–01	1	Úrvalsdeild karla	10th	6–16	DNQ	
2001–02	1	Úrvalsdeild karla	9th	8–14	DNQ	
Lower leagues
2005–06	1	Úrvalsdeild karla	11th	5–17	DNQ	
2006–07	2	1. deild karla	1st	14–0		
2007–08	1	Úrvalsdeild karla	8th	10–12	1st round	
2008–09	1	Úrvalsdeild karla	11th	6–16	DNQ	
2009–10	2	1. deild karla	8th	6–12	DNQ	
2010–11	2	1. deild karla	2nd	13–5	Semi-finals	
2011–12	2	1. deild karla	7th	7–11	DNQ	
2012–13	2	1. deild karla	5th	10–8	Semi-finals	
2013–14	2	1. deild karla	3rd	13–5	Semi-finals	
2014–15	2	1. deild karla	8th	1–20	DNQ	
2015–16	2	1. deild karla	1st	15–3		
2016–17	1	Úrvalsdeild karla	8th	11–11	1st round	
2017–18	1	Úrvalsdeild karla	11th	3–19	DNQ	
2018–19	2	1. deild karla	1st	17–4	N/A	
2019–20	1	Úrvalsdeild karla	11th	6–15	N/A^{1}	
2020–21	1	Úrvalsdeild karla	7th	10–12	1st round	
2021–22	1	Úrvalsdeild karla	12th	1–21	N/A	2nd round

Notes
^{1} 2020 playoffs canceled due to the Coronavirus pandemic in Iceland.

== Trophies and awards ==
=== Trophies ===
- 1. deild karla (6):

1967, 1977, 1994, 2005, 2007, 2011, 2016, 2019

- 2. deild karla (2):

1982, 2003

=== Awards ===
Úrvalsdeild Men's Domestic All-First Team

- Óðinn Ásgeirsson – 2001, 2002

== Notable players ==
Note: Flags indicate national team eligibility at FIBA-sanctioned events. Players may hold other non-FIBA nationalities not displayed.

Criteria

To appear in this section a player must have either:

- Set a club record or won an individual award while at the club
- Played at least one official international match for their national team at any time
- Played at least one official NBA match at any time.

- (Iceland) Birgir Örn Birgisson
- (Iceland) Danero Thomas
- (Iceland) Darrel Lewis
- (Ivory Coast) Guy Edi
- (Iceland) Einar Bollason
- (Iceland) Friðrik Erlendur Stefánsson
- (Colombia) Hansel Atencia
- (Iceland) Hilmar Smári Henningsson
- (Iceland) Hjörtur Harðarson
- (Iceland) Ívar DeCarsta Webster
- (Republic of Ireland) Jordan Blount
- (Iceland) Konráð Herner Óskarsson
- (Iceland) Kristinn Friðriksson
- (United States) Mark Christensen
- (Iceland) Óðinn Ásgeirsson
- (Iceland) Tryggvi Hlinason
- (Iceland) Þröstur Leó Jóhannsson

== Notable coaches ==
- (Iceland) Einar Bollason 1967–1969
- (United States) Mark Christensen 1978–1979
- (United States) Gary Schwartz 1979–1981
- (United States) DeCarsta Webster 1986–1987
- (Iceland) Þröstur Guðjónsson 1987–1988
- (Iceland) Eiríkur Sigurðsson 1988–1989
- (United States) Dan Kennard 1989–1990
- (Iceland) Skarphéðinn Eiríksson 1990
- (Iceland) Sturla Örlygsson 1990–1991
- (United States) Brad Casey 1991–1992
- (Iceland) Hrannar Hólm 1994–1995
- (Iceland) Jón Guðmundsson 1995–1996
- (United States) Fred Williams 1996–1997
- (Iceland) Gunnar Sverrison 1997–1998
- (Iceland) Ágúst Herbert Guðmundsson 1998–2001
- (Iceland) Hjörtur Harðarson 2001–2002
- (Iceland) Guðmundur Ævar Oddsson 2002–2003
- (Spain) Julian Alman Martinez 2003–2004
- (Iceland) Hrafn Kristjánsson 2004–2009
- (Iceland) Böðvar Kristjánsson 2009-2010
- (Poland) Konrad Tota 2010-2011
- (Serbia) Nebojša Vidić 2011–2012
- (Iceland) Bjarki Ármann Oddsson 2012–2014
- (Iceland) Elías Kristjánsson 2014–2015
- (Iceland) Benedikt Guðmundsson 2015–2017
- (Iceland) Hjalti Þór Vilhjálmsson 2017–2018
- (Iceland) Lárus Jónsson 2018–2020
- (United States) Andrew Johnston 2020
- (Iceland) Bjarki Ármann Oddsson 2020–2022
- (Iceland) Óskar Þór Þorsteinsson 2022–2024
- (Iceland) Þröstur Leó Jóhannsson 2024–2025
- (Spain) Ricardo González Dávila 2025–2026
- (Iceland) Þröstur Leó Jóhannsson 2026–present
