= Friðrik Erlendur Stefánsson =

Icelandic basketball player

Personal information
- Born: 6 October 1976 (age 50) Iceland
- Listed height: 6 ft 8 in (2.03 m)
- Listed weight: 260 lb (118 kg)

Career information
- Playing career: 1993–2015
- Position: Forward / center

Career history
- 1993–1994: KR
- 1994–1995: KFÍ
- 1995–1996: Þór Ak
- 1996: ÍV
- 1996–1998: KFÍ
- 1998–2000: Njarðvík
- 2000: Lappeenrannan NMKY
- 2001–2015: Njarðvík

Career highlights
- Úrvalsdeild Domestic player of the Year (2006); Úrvalsdeild Defense Player of the Year (2005); Úrvalsdeild Young Player of the Year (1997); 6× Úrvalsdeild Domestic All-First Team (1998, 2000, 2002, 2005–2007); 3× Icelandic champion (2001, 2002, 2006); 3× Icelandic Basketball Cup (1999, 2002, 2005); 6× Icelandic Supercup (1999, 2001, 2002, 2004–2006); Icelandic All-Star Game MVP (2004)
Medals
Men's basketball
Representing Iceland
Games of the Small States of Europe
Silver medal – second place	2001 San Marino	National Team
Silver medal – second place	2003 Malta	National Team
Silver medal – second place	2005 Andorra	National Team
Gold medal – first place	2007 Andorra	National Team

Friðrik Erlendur Stefánsson (born 6 October 1976) is an Icelandic former professional basketball player who spent 17 seasons with Njarðvík, winning the Icelandic national championship three times and the Icelandic Basketball Cup three times.

In 2006 he was voted as the Úrvalsdeild domestic player of the year.

== Early life and career ==
Friðrik grew up in Vestmannaeyjar where he started practicing basketball at the age of 16 with a local team called Týr. During a school trip in Njarðvík in 1992, he was spotted by Axel Nikulásson, the head coach of the Icelandic U-16 team, who selected him for the team's games in August that year. He was the first player to play for the Icelandic national team before playing in any official games organized by the Icelandic Basketball Federation. In December 1993, he joined KR for the rest of the 1993–1994 season. In March 1994, he was injured on practice after a backboard of a basket fell on him after a dunk. After starting the 1994–95 season with KR, he joined 1. deild karla club KFÍ in October. He started the following season with KFÍ, but left to join Úrvalsdeild club Þór Akureyri in November 1995. He left the club in February 1996 after failing to break into the rotation. In March 1996, he appeared in two games for Íþróttafélag Vestmannaeyja (ÍV) in the 2. deild karla where he averaged 18.5 points per game.

== National team career ==
Between 1997 and 2008, Friðrik played 112 games for the Icelandic national team. He was selected to Iceland's squad for the 2005 Games of the Small States of Europe but missed the games after suffering an eye injury on practice.

== Health problems ==
In 2007 Friðrik had a heart surgery to correct an atrial flutter problem. In the previous years he had collapsed twice while playing, in the 2005 playoffs and once with the Icelandic national team. He missed the 2008 Úrvalsdeild playoffs due to irregular heartbeat.

In 2014 he retired from top division play, siding various injuries, but continued to play with Njarðvík's B-team in the lower divisions. In 2015, in a game with the B-team, he collapsed once again and had to be resuscitated.

== Awards and achievements ==
=== Club honours ===
- Icelandic Champion: (3)
  - 2001, 2002, 2006
- Icelandic Basketball Cup: (3)
  - 1999, 2002, 2005
- Icelandic Basketball Supercup: (6)
  - 1999, 2001, 2002, 2004, 2005, 2006
- Icelandic Company Cup (3)
  - Winners (3): 2001, 2003, 2005
- Icelandic Division I champion:
  - 1996

=== Individual awards ===
- Úrvalsdeild Domestic player of the Year:
  - 2006
- Úrvalsdeild Defense Player of the Year:
  - 2005
- Úrvalsdeild Young Player of the Year:
  - 1997
- Úrvalsdeild Domestic All-First Team: (6)
  - 1998, 2000, 2002, 2005–2007
