= Fjölnir (men's basketball) =

Ungmennafélagið Fjölnir
- Leagues: 1. deild karla
- History: Fjölnir (1996–2000); Valur/Fjölnir (2000-2001); Fjölnir (2001–present)
- Arena: Dalhús
- Location: Grafarvogur, Iceland
- Team colors: Blue, yellow
- Website: fjolnir.is

The Fjölnir men's basketball, commonly known as Fjölnir, is the men's basketball department of Ungmennafélagið Fjölnir multi-sport club. It is based in Grafarvogur, Reykjavík. As of the 2019-2020 season it plays in the Úrvalsdeild karla.

== Titles and awards ==
=== Titles ===
- 2. deild karla:
  - Winners (2): 2002

=== Individual awards ===
- Úrvalsdeild Men's Young Player of the Year
  - Ægir Steinarsson - 2010, 2011
  - Hörður Axel Vilhjálmsson - 2006
- Úrvalsdeild Men's Coach of the Year
  - Benedikt Guðmundsson - 2005
- 1. deild karla Domestic Player of the Year
  - Róbert Sigurðsson - 2019
- 1. deild karla Domestic All-First team
  - Haukur Helgi Pálsson - 2009
  - Róbert Sigurðsson - 2016, 2017, 2019
  - Sigvaldi Eggertsson - 2018
  - Ægir Þór Steinarsson - 2009
- 1. deild karla Coach of the Year
  - Bárður Eyþórsson - 2010

== Notable players ==
Note: Flags indicate national team eligibility at FIBA-sanctioned events. Players may hold other non-FIBA nationalities not displayed.

Criteria

To appear in this section a player must have either:

- Set a club record or won an individual award while at the club
- Played at least one official international match for their national team at any time
- Played at least one official NBA match at any time.

- (Iceland) Árni Ragnarsson
- (Iceland) Collin Pryor
- (Iceland) Danero Thomas
- (Iceland) Gunnar Ólafsson
- (Iceland) Haukur Pálsson
- (Iceland) Hörður Axel Vilhjálmsson
- (Canada) Keith Vassell
- (Iceland) Kristinn Jónasson
- (Iceland) Lárus Jónsson
- (Iceland) Ægir Steinarsson

== Coaches ==
- (Iceland) Pétur Karl Guðmundsson 2000
- (Iceland) Benedikt Guðmundsson 2003–2006
- (Canada) Keith Vassell 2006
- (Iceland) Bárður Eyþórsson 2006–2010
- (Iceland) Tómas Holton 2010
- (Iceland) Örvar Þór Kristjánsson 2010–2012
- (Iceland) Hjalti Þór Vilhjálmsson 2012–2017
- (Iceland) Falur Harðarson 2017–2020
- (Iceland) Halldór Karl Þórsson 2020–2022
- (North Macedonia) Borce Ilievski 2022–2024
- (Iceland) Baldur Már Stefánsson 2024–present

== External sites ==
- Team profile at kki.is
