= Danero Thomas =

American and Icelandic basketball player

Personal information
- Born: April 8, 1986 (age 40) New Orleans, Louisiana
- Listed height: 193 cm (6 ft 4 in)
- Listed weight: 86 kg (190 lb)

Career information
- High school: Mount Zion (Bastrop, Louisiana)
- College: Murray State (2006–2010)
- Playing career: 2010–present
- Position: Forward

Career history
- 2012: KR
- 2012: KR-b
- 2013–2014: Hamar
- 2014: Valur
- 2015: Fjölnir
- 2015–2017: Þór Akureyri
- 2017–2018: ÍR
- 2018–2019: Tindastóll
- 2019: Hamar
- 2019–2021: ÍR
- 2021–2023: Breiðablik
- 2023: Hamar
- 2024: Keflavík

Career highlights
- Icelandic Cup (2024); Icelandic Super Cup (2018); Icelandic D1 champion (2016)

Danero Axel Thomas (born 8 April 1986) is an American and Icelandic basketball player. A naturalized Icelandic citizen, he debuted with the Icelandic national basketball team in 2018. Thomas played college basketball for Murray State from 2006 to 2010 and later professionally in Iceland for over a decade.

== College ==
Thomas played college basketball for Murray State from 2006 to 2010. On March 19, 2010, he scored a 15-foot fadeaway shot at the buzzer, giving 13th-seeded Murray State a 66–65 victory over fourth-seeded Vanderbilt in the first round of the 2010 NCAA Division I men's basketball tournament.

== Playing career ==
Thomas joined KR prior to the 2012–2013 Úrvalsdeild karla season but was released from his contract in November that year. In 7 regular season games, he averaged 11.1 points and 5 rebounds.

Thomas joined Þór Akureyri in 2015 and helped them win the 1. deild karla in 2016 and gain promotion to Úrvalsdeild karla. He left the club in January 2017, after averaging 16.6 points, 7.1 rebounds and 3.1 in thirteen games, and joined ÍR.

On March 25, 2018, Thomas scored the game winning and series clinching basket in game five of ÍR's first round playoffs series against Stjarnan.

On May 8, 2018, Thomas signed with Tindastóll. On 30 September, he won the Icelandic Super Cup after Tindastóll beat KR, 103–72. During the regular season, Thomas averaged 13.2 points and 5.9 rebounds and played all 22 games. In the playoffs, he averaged 14.4 points and 7.4 rebounds but was unable to prevent the team from a heartbreaking loss against Þór Þorlákshöfn in the first round of the playoffs.

In September 2019, Thomas signed with Hamar where he had previously played during the 2013–2014 season. As he aspired to play for a bigger club, the contract included an escape clause that allowed him to leave the club with short notice. Two months later, in November, Thomas left Hamar and signed ÍR. At the time of his departure, he was averaging 17.2 points and 6.0 rebounds for the unbeaten Hamar.

In June 2021, Thomas signed with newly promoted Breiðablik. In April 2022, Thomas resigned with Breiðablik.

In September 2023, Thomas signed with Hamar for the third time in his career. On 15 December 2023 he announced that he was retiring from playing. In 11 games for Hamar in the Úrvalsdeild, he averaged 10.8 points and 6.2 rebounds per game. However, in January 2024 he signed with Keflavík after being convinced by Keflavík's coach Pétur Ingvarsson to come out of retirement. On 23 March 2024, he won the Icelandic Basketball Cup with Keflavík.

== National team career ==
Thomas received an Icelandic citizenship in July 2018. On 23 August 2018, Thomas was selected to the 24-man training camp of the Icelandic national basketball team prior to its upcoming games in the EuroBasket 2021 qualification. On 1 September 2018, he was selected to the team for its upcoming games against Norway. He played his first game for Iceland on 2 September, scoring 8 points in a 71–69 victory against Norway.

== Personal life ==
Thomas is married to Fanney Lind Thomas, an Icelandic former professional basketball player and a former member of Icelandic national basketball team. After receiving his Icelandic citizenship in 2018, he took up the Icelandic middle name Axel.
