= Breiðablik (men's basketball) =

Men's basketball department of the Breiðablik sports club

- Founded: 1967
- History: Breiðablik; 1967–present
- Arena: Smárinn
- Location: Kópavogur, Iceland
- Team colors: Green, white, red
- Head coach: Hrafn Kristjánsson; Mikael Máni Hrafnsson
- Website: Breidablik.is
Home	Away

The Breiðabliks men's basketball team, commonly known as Breiðablik, is the men's basketball department of the Breiðablik multi-sport club. It is based in Kópavogur, Iceland.

Breiðablik also has a men's reserve team that plays in the amateur level Icelandic 4th-tier 3. deild karla, called Breiðablik-b.

== Honours ==
=== Titles ===
Division I

- Winners (6): 1976, 1992, 1995, 2001, 2008, 2021

Division II

- Winners (1): 1985

=== Individual awards ===
- Úrvalsdeild Men's Coach of the Year
  - Birgir Guðbjörnsson - 1996
  - Eggert Garðarsson - 2002
- Úrvalsdeild Men's Domestic All-First Team
  - Pálmi Freyr Sigurgeirsson - 2002, 2004
- Úrvalsdeild Men's Young Player of the Year
  - Rúnar Ingi Erlingsson - 2009

== Notable past players ==
Note: Flags indicate national team eligibility at FIBA-sanctioned events. Players may hold other non-FIBA nationalities not displayed.

Criteria

To appear in this section a player must have either:

- Set a club record or won an individual award while at the club
- Played at least one official international match for their national team at any time
- Played at least one official NBA match at any time.

- (Iceland) Birgir Mikaelsson
- (Iceland) Brynjar Karl Sigurðsson
- (Iceland) Danero Thomas
- (Iceland) Frank Aron Booker
- (Iceland) Ívar Ásgrímsson
- (Iceland) Ívar DeCarsta Webster
- (United States) Joe Wright
- (Iceland) Jón Arnar Ingvarsson
- (Iceland) Mirko Stefán Virjevic
- (Iceland) Pálmar Sigurðsson
- (Iceland) Pálmi Freyr Sigurgeirsson
- (Iceland) Pétur Guðmundsson
- (Iceland) Sigtryggur Arnar Björnsson
- (Iceland) Hafþór Júlíus Björnsson

== Coaches ==
- (Iceland) Pálmar Sigurðsson 1993–1995
- (Iceland) Jón Arnar Ingvarsson 2002–2005
- (Iceland) Hrafn Kristjánsson 2009–2010
- (North Macedonia) Borce Ilievski 2012–2014
- (Iceland) Pétur Ingvarsson 2018–2023
- (Iceland) Ívar Ásgrímsson 2023–2024
- (Iceland) Hrafn Kristjánsson and Mikael Máni Hrafnsson 2024–present

== Reserve team ==
In 2019, Breiðablik-b won the 3. deild karla after beating ÍR in the league finals and achieved promotion to the 2. deild karla.

=== Titles ===
Division III

- Winners: 2019
