= Þór Þorlákshöfn =

Icelandic sports club

- Full name: Ungmennafélagið Þór
- Sports: Athletics; Badminton; Basketball; Motorcycle sport Track & field
- Founded: 23 June 1960; 65 years ago
- Website: umfthor.is

Ungmennafélagið Þór, commonly known as Þór Þorlákshöfn, is a multi-sport club in Þorlákshöfn, Iceland. It has active departments in athletics, badminton, basketball, motorcycle sports and track & field but has also featured various other sports, such as football and handball.

== Basketball ==
=== History ===
On 25 June 2021, Þór men's basketball team won its first ever Icelandic championship by beating Keflavík in the Úrvalsdeild finals. Adomas Drungilas was named the Úrvalsdeild Playoffs MVP.
