= KR (men's basketball) =

- Nickname: KR
- Founded: 4 October 1956; 70 years ago
- History: KR; 1956–present
- Arena: Meistaravellir
- Capacity: 1,500
- Location: Reykjavík, Iceland
- Team colors: Black, White
- Head coach: Jakob Sigurðarson
- Assistant: Jere Anttila
- Affiliation: KR-b
- Championships: 18 Úrvalsdeild karla
- Website: www.krkarfa.is
Home	Away

The KR men's basketball team, commonly known as KR or KR Basket, is a basketball club based in Reykjavík, Iceland. It was founded on 4 October 1956 and is the men's basketball department of Knattspyrnufélag Reykjavíkur (English: Reykjavík Football Club) multi-sport club. It has won the Icelandic championship eighteen times, the most national championships in the men's top-tier league history. It won a record 6 national championships in a row from 2014 to 2019.

== Recent history ==
In 2017, the team played in FIBA Europe Cup for the first time since 2008.

In March 2023, the team was relegated to the second-tier 1. deild karla for the first time in its history. A year later, it finished first in 1. deild karla and gained promotion back to the Úrvalsdeild.

== Reserve team ==
KR has a men's reserve team that plays in the amateur level Icelandic 3rd-tier Division II and the Icelandic basketball cup, called KR-b. It is also affiliated with Knattspyrnufélag Vesturbæjar.

== Honors ==
- Úrvalsdeild karla (18):

1965, 1966, 1967, 1968, 1974, 1978, 1979, 1990, 2000, 2007, 2009, 2011, 2014, 2015, 2016, 2017, 2018, 2019

- Icelandic Basketball Cup (15):

1966, 1967, 1970, 1971, 1972, 1973, 1974, 1977, 1979, 1984, 1991, 2011, 2016, 2017, 2026

- Icelandic Supercup (4):

2000, 2007, 2014, 2015

- Company Cup (2):

2008, 2014

- 1. deild karla (1):

2024

== Season by season ==
Season	Tier	League	Pos.	Icelandic Cup	European competitions		
2006–07	1	Úrvalsdeild karla	1st				
2007–08	1	Úrvalsdeild karla	2nd		3 FIBA EuroCup	QR1	0–2
2008–09	1	Úrvalsdeild karla	1st	Runner-up			
2009–10	1	Úrvalsdeild karla	2nd				
2010–11	1	Úrvalsdeild karla	1st	Champion			
2011–12	1	Úrvalsdeild karla	3rd	Semifinalist			
2012–13	1	Úrvalsdeild karla	4th				
2013–14	1	Úrvalsdeild karla	1st				
2014–15	1	Úrvalsdeild karla	1st	Runner-up			
2015–16	1	Úrvalsdeild karla	1st	Champion			
2016–17	1	Úrvalsdeild karla	1st	Champion			
2017–18	1	Úrvalsdeild karla	1st	Runner-up	4 FIBA Europe Cup	QR1	0–2
2018–19	1	Úrvalsdeild karla	1st	Semifinalist			
2019–20	1	Úrvalsdeild karla	4th	1st round			
2020–21	1	Úrvalsdeild karla	5th	2nd round			
2021–22	1	Úrvalsdeild karla	8th	3rd round			
2022–23	1	Úrvalsdeild karla	12th	Quarter-finals			
2023–24	2	1. deild karla	1st	Quarter-finals			
2024–25	1	Úrvalsdeild karla	9th	Runner-up			
2025–26	2	Úrvalsdeild karla	6th	Champion			

== Players ==
=== Current roster ===
Note: Flags indicate national team eligibility at FIBA-sanctioned events. Players may hold other non-FIBA nationalities not displayed.

KR roster
Players
Coaches

Pos.	No.	Nat.	Name	Ht.	Wt.	Age
SF	0	(Iceland)	Hallgrímur Þrastarson	1.93 m (6 ft 4 in)		20 – 26 December 2005
F	1	(Iceland)	Þorvaldur Árnason	1.98 m (6 ft 6 in)		24 – 17 June 2002
G	4	(Serbia)	Aleksa Jugović	1.93 m (6 ft 4 in)		31 – 30 March 1995
G	6	(Iceland)	Reynir Róbertsson	1.85 m (6 ft 1 in)		22 – 2 October 2004
G	9	(Iceland)	Þórir Þorbjarnarson	1.98 m (6 ft 6 in)		28 – 26 May 1998
B	10	(Iceland)	Lárus Grétar Ólafsson	1.86 m (6 ft 1 in)		18 – 5 February 2008
F	11	(Iceland)	Friðrik Jónsson	2.00 m (6 ft 7 in)		24 – 21 March 2002
F	12	(United States)	K.J. Doucet	2.01 m (6 ft 7 in)		23 – 19 February 2003
F	13	(Iceland)	Orri Hilmarsson	1.90 m (6 ft 3 in)		26 – 30 November 1999
G	15	(Iceland)	Veigar Áki Hlynsson	1.98 m (6 ft 6 in)		17 – 9 May 2009
G	19	(Iceland)	Benóni Stefán Andrason	1.92 m (6 ft 4 in)		19 – 11 October 2006
F	23	(Latvia)	Linards Jaunzems	2.00 m (6 ft 7 in)		31 – 3 October 1995
G	27	(Iceland)	Lars Bragason	1.92 m (6 ft 4 in)		19 – 11 October 2006
C	32	(Croatia)	Vlatko Granic	2.06 m (6 ft 9 in)		32 – 15 July 1994
PG		(Latvia)	Toms Leimanis	1.90 m (6 ft 3 in)		32 – 7 August 1994

Head coach

- (Iceland) Jakob Sigurdarson

Assistant coach(es)

- (Finland) Jere Anttila

Legend

- (C) Team captain
- Injured

- Roster
Updated: January 3, 2026

== Notable players ==
Note: Flags indicate national team eligibility at FIBA-sanctioned events. Players may hold other non-FIBA nationalities not displayed.

Criteria

To appear in this section a player must have either:

- Set a club record or won an individual award while at the club
- Played at least one official international match for their national team at any time
- Played at least one official NBA match at any time.

- (Finland) Aapeli Alanen
- (Iceland) Almar Orri Atlason
- (Soviet Union) Anatolij Kovtun
- (Iceland) Axel Nikulásson
- (Iceland) Ágúst Líndal
- (Iceland) Baldur Ólafsson
- (Iceland) Birgir Guðbjörnsson
- (Iceland) Birgir Mikaelsson
- (Iceland) Bjarni Jóhannesson
- (Republic of Ireland) Brian Fitzpatrick
- (Iceland) Brynjar Þór Björnsson
- (Iceland) Brynjólfur Markússon
- (Finland) Carl Lindbom
- (United States) Curtis Carter
- (Iceland) Danero Thomas
- (United States) David Grissom
- (Iceland) (Indonesia) Davíð Janis
- (Kosovo) Edmond Azemi
- (Iceland) Einar Bollason
- (Iceland) Eiríkur Önundarson
- (Iceland) Emil Barja
- (Iceland) Fannar Ólafsson
- (Iceland) Finnur Atli Magnússon
- (Iceland) Friðrik Erlendur Stefánsson
- (Iceland) Friðrik Ragnarsson
- (Iceland) Garðar Jóhannsson
- (Iceland) Geir Þorsteinsson
- (Iceland) Gísli Gíslason
- (Iceland) Guðni Ólafur Guðnason
- (Iceland) Gunnar Gunnarsson
- (Iceland) Guttormur Ólafsson
- (Iceland) Herbert Arnarson
- (Iceland) Hermann Hauksson
- (Iceland) Hilmar Viktorsson
- (Iceland) Hjörtur Hansson
- (Iceland) Ingvaldur Magni Hafsteinsson
- (Iceland) Jakob Sigurðarson
- (United States) Jason Dourisseau
- (Denmark) Jesper Winter Sörensen
- (Iceland) Jón Arnór Stefánsson
- (Iceland) Jón Sigurðsson
- (Iceland) Jónatan James Bow
- (United States) Julian Boyd
- (Canada) Keith Vassell
- (Iceland) Kolbeinn Pálsson
- (Iceland) Kristinn Stefánsson
- (Iceland) Kristófer Acox
- (Iceland) Lárus Jónsson
- (United States) Marcus Walker
- (Iceland) Martin Hermannsson
- (Iceland) Matthías Orri Sigurðarson
- (United States) Michael Craion
- (Iceland) Nökkvi Már Jónsson
- (Iceland) Pavel Ermolinskij
- (Iceland) Páll Kolbeinsson
- (Iceland) Ólafur Jón Ormsson
- (Iceland) Símon Ólafsson
- (Iceland) Skarphéðinn Ingason
- (United States) Stew Johnson
- (United States) Tyson Patterson
- (Iceland) Þórir Þorbjarnarson
- (Denmark) Zarko Jukic
- (Iceland) Þorvaldur Orri Árnason
- (Iceland) Þórir Þorbjarnarson
- (Iceland) Þröstur Guðmundsson

== Head coaches ==
- (Iceland) Ólafur Þór Thorlacius 1962–1963
- (United States) Tom Robinson 1964–1965
- (United States) Philip Bensing 1965
- (United States) Thomas Curren 1966
- (Iceland) Einar Bollason 1966–1967
- (United States) Gordon Godfrey 1967–1969
- (Iceland) Einar Bollason 1973–1974
- (United States) Andrew Piazza 1977–1978
- (Iceland) Gunnar Gunnarsson 1978–1980
- (United States) Keith Yow 1980–1981
- (United States) Stewart Johnson 1981–1983
- (Iceland) Jón Sigurðsson 1983–1986
- (Iceland) Gunnar Gunnarsson 1986–1987
- (Iceland) Birgir Guðbjörnsson 1987–1988
- (Hungary) Dr. László Németh 1988–1990
- (Iceland) Páll Kolbeinsson 1990–1991
- (Iceland) Birgir Guðbjörnsson 1991–1992
- (Iceland) Friðrik Ingi Rúnarsson 1992–1993
- (Hungary) Dr. László Németh 1993–1994
- (Iceland) Axel Nikulásson 1994–1996
- (Iceland) Kristinn Vilbergsson 1996
- (Iceland) Benedikt Guðmundsson 1996–1997
- (Iceland) Hrannar Hólm 1997
- (Iceland) Jón Sigurðsson 1997–1998
- (Canada) Keith Vassell 1998–1999
- (Iceland) Ingi Þór Steinþórsson 1999–2004
- (Iceland) Herbert Arnarson 2004–2006
- (Iceland) Benedikt Guðmundsson 2006–2009
- (Iceland) Páll Kolbeinsson 2009–2010
- (Iceland) Hrafn Kristjánsson 2010–2012
- (Iceland) Helgi Már Magnússon 2012–2013
- (Iceland) Finnur Freyr Stefánsson 2013–2018
- (Iceland) Ingi Þór Steinþórsson 2018–2020
- (Iceland) Darri Freyr Atlason 2020–2021
- (Iceland) Helgi Már Magnússon 2021–2023
- (Iceland) Jakob Sigurðarson 2023–present
