= Pavel Ermolinskij =

Icelandic basketball player (born 1987)

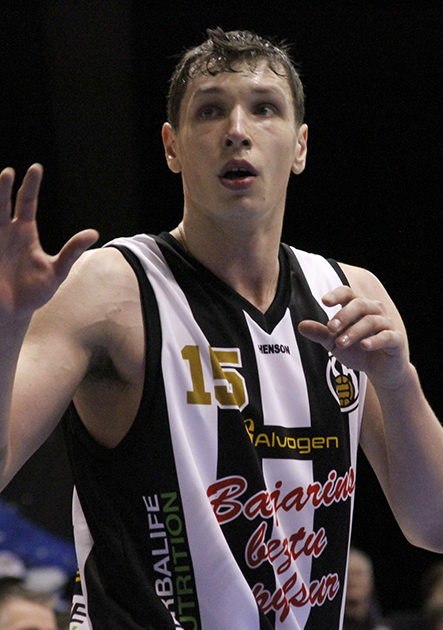
- Pavel Ermolinskij with KR in February 2015.

Personal information
- Born: 25 January 1987 (age 39) Moscow, Soviet Union
- Listed height: 6 ft 8 in (2.03 m)

Career information
- Playing career: 1998–2022
- Position: Point guard

Career history

Playing
- 1998: ÍA
- 2001–2002: Skallagrímur
- 2002–2003: ÍR
- 2003–2004: JA Vichy
- 2004–2005: Unicaja Málaga
- 2005–2007: CB Axarquia
- 2007–2008: CB Ciudad de Huelva
- 2008–2009: UB La Palma
- 2009–2010: Cáceres 2016 Basket
- 2010: → KR
- 2010–2011: KR
- 2011–2012: Sundsvall Dragons
- 2012–2013: Norrköping Dolphins
- 2013–2019: KR
- 2019–2022: Valur

Coaching
- 2021–2022: Valur (assistant)
- 2023–2024: Tindastóll
- 2026: Grindavík (assistant)

Career highlights
- As player: 2× Úrvalsdeild Domestic Player of the Year (2011, 2015); 4× Úrvalsdeild Domestic All-First Team (2011, 2014–2016); Spanish King's Cup Winner (2005); 8× Icelandic league champion (2011, 2014–2019, 2022); 3× Icelandic Cup winner (2011, 2016, 2017); 2× Icelandic Super Cup winner (2014, 2015); 2× Úrvalsdeild assist leader (2015, 2018); As head coach: Icelandic league champion (2023); As assistant coach: Icelandic league champion (2022)

Pavel Ermolinskij (born 25 January 1987) is an Icelandic basketball coach and former player of Russian descent, a member of the Icelandic national team. He played in the Spanish Liga ACB for several seasons, winning the Spanish King's Cup in 2005. As a player, won the Icelandic championship eight times, seven times with KR, in 2011 and 2014 to 2019, and in 2022 with Valur. In 2023, he guided Tindastóll to their first Icelandic championship in his first year as a head coach.

== Early life ==
Pavel was born in Moscow in the Soviet Union to Soviet national basketball team player Alexander Ermolinskij. The family moved to Hungary in his youth, where his father played professionally and in 1992, when he was five, they emigrated to Iceland when his father signed with Skallagrímur in Borgarnes.

== Playing career ==
=== Club career ===
Pavel first appeared in a Úrvalsdeild karla game on 6 March 1998, at the age of only 11, when his father and head coach of Körfuknattleiksfélag ÍA, Alexander Ermolinskij, selected him for the 10-man squad against Njarðvík. At the time there were no rules regarding minimum age of players in the league.

His next taste of the senior team was with Skallagrímur during the 2001–02 season when he appeared in 15 games, averaging 1.8 points per game.

During the 2014-2015 season, Pavel averaged a triple-double in the Úrvalsdeild with 13.3 points, 10.5 rebounds and 10.3 assists per game in 15 regular season games.

Pavel led the Úrvalsdeild karla in assists during the 2017-2018 season. On 28 April 2018 he won his sixth Icelandic championship after KR defeated Tindastóll in the Úrvalsdeild finals. It was the eighteenth straight playoffs series he won in the Úrvalsdeild playoffs. After sitting out the first three games of the 2018–2019 season, Pavel resumed training with KR in end of October. On 4 May 2019 he won his 7th national championship after KR beat ÍR in the Úrvalsdeild finals 3–2.

On 13 August 2019, Pavel signed a 2-year contract with KR's Reykjavík rivals Valur. He started the season strong, with big fourth quarter performances in victories against Fjölnir and Þór Þorlákshöfn. On 25 October, he scored the game winning three pointer with 5 seconds left in an overtime victory against Tindastóll. On 5 January 2020, Pavel was 1 assist shy of the Úrvalsdeild record when he handed out 17 assists in a victory against Fjölnir.

On 6 May 2022, he played his 100th Úrvalsdeild playoffs game when Valur defeated Tindastóll in game one of the 2022 Úrvalsdeild finals. On 18 May 2022, he won his eight national championship after Valur defeated Tindastóll in the Úrvalsdeild finals.

On 22 August 2022, Pavel announced he would not return to Valur and in October, he announced his retirement from playing.

=== National team career ===
Pavel has played with the Icelandic national basketball team since 2004 and participated in EuroBasket 2015 and EuroBasket 2017.

== Coaching career ==
Pavel served as an assistant coach for Valur during the 2021–22 season.

On 14 January 2023, he was hired as the head coach of Tindastóll, replacing Vladimir Anzulović. On 18 May 2023, he guided Tindastóll to its first ever national championship.

In June, he signed a 2-year contract extension with Tindastóll. In march, Pavel took an indefinite medical leave and missed the rest of the season. On 28 May 2024, both parties announced that he would no return the following season.

In January 2026, he joined Grindavík, filling in as an assistant coach to Helgi Már Magnússon, who temporary took over as head coach while Jóhann Þór Ólafsson took a leave of absence due to an illness in his family.

== Honours ==
=== Iceland ===
==== Club ====
- Icelandic Champion (8): 2011, 2014, 2015, 2016, 2017, 2018, 2019, 2022
- Icelandic Cup (3): 2011, 2016, 2017
- Icelandic Super Cup (2): 2014, 2015
- Icelandic Company Cup: 2014

==== Individual ====
- Úrvalsdeild Domestic Player of the Year (2): 2011, 2015
- Úrvalsdeild Domestic All-First Team (4): 2011, 2014–2016
- Icelandic Cup MVP: 2011

=== Spain ===
==== Club ====
- Spanish King's Cup: 2005

=== Coach ===
==== Head coach ====
- Icelandic Champion: 2023

==== Assistant coach ====
- Icelandic Champion: 2022
