= Úrvalsdeild Men's Domestic All-First Team =

The Úrvalsdeild karla Domestic All-First Team is an annual Úrvalsdeild karla honor bestowed on the best domestic players in the league following every season. It has been awarded since the 1987-88 season.

== All-time award winners ==
*	Elected to the National Olympic and Sports Association of Iceland Hall of Fame
Player (X)	Denotes the number of times the player has been selected
**Player** **(in bold text)**	Indicates the player who won the Úrvalsdeild karla Domestic Player of the Year in the same year (Note: The Player of the Year award was first established in 1968.)

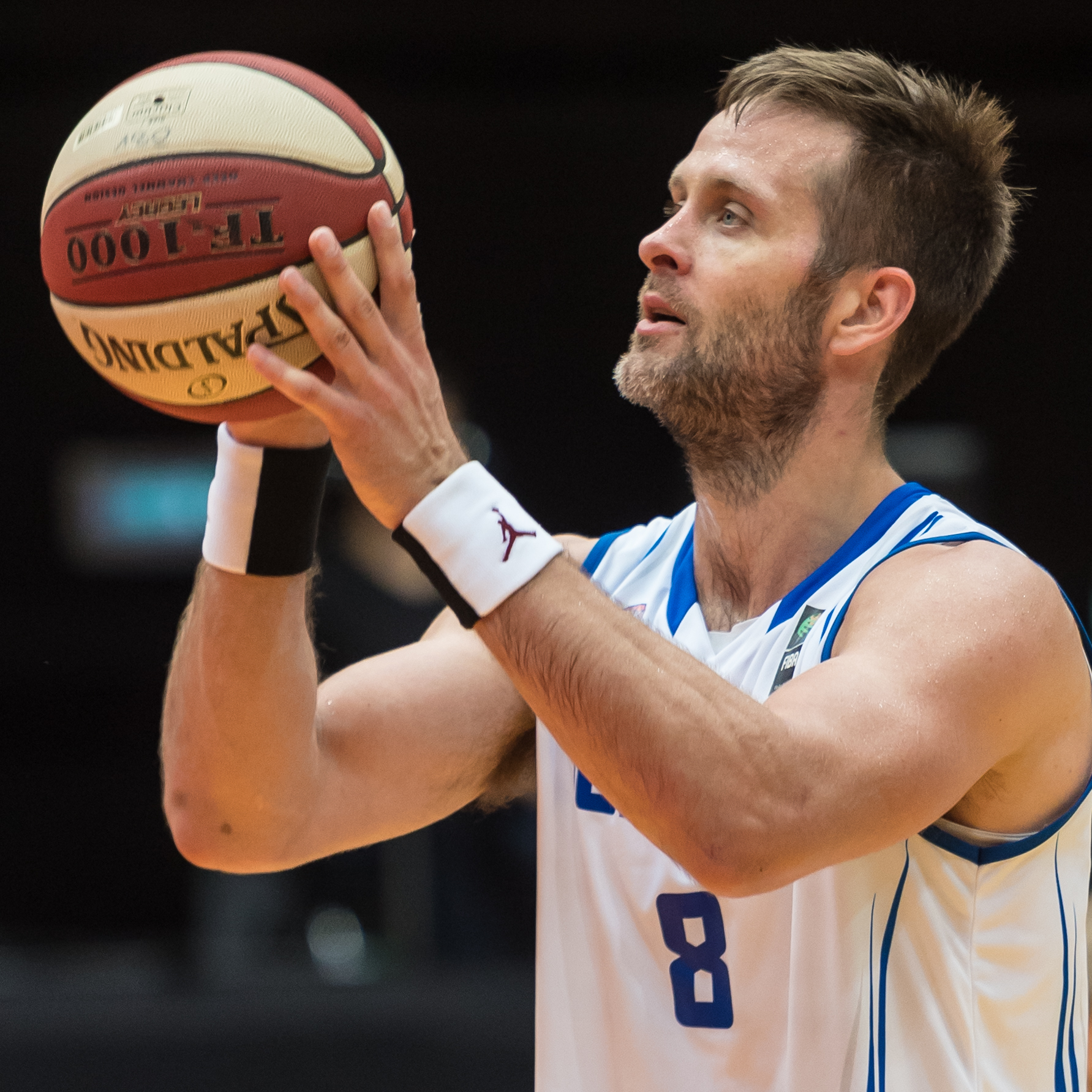
Hlynur Bæringsson has been selected to the Domestic All-First team 10 times.

Season	First team	
Season	Players	Teams
1987-88	Guðmundur Bragason	Grindavík
1987-88	Guðni Guðnason	KR
1987-88	Jón Kr. Gíslason	Keflavík
1987-88	Pálmar Sigurðsson	Haukar
1987-88	**Valur Ingimundarson**	Njarðvík
1988-89	Guðmundur Bragason (2)	Grindavík
1988-89	Jón Kr. Gíslason (2)	Keflavík
1988-89	**Teitur Örlygsson**	Njarðvík
1988-89	Tómas Holton	Valur
1988-89	Valur Ingimundarson (2)	Tindastóll
1989-90	Guðjón Skúlason	Keflavík
1989-90	Jón Kr. Gíslason (3)	Keflavík
1989-90	**Páll Kolbeinsson**	KR
1989-90	Teitur Örlygsson (2)	Njarðvík
1989-90	Valur Ingimundarson (3)	Tindastóll
1990-91	Falur Harðarson	Keflavík
1990-91	Jón Kr. Gíslason (4)	Keflavík
1990-91	**Magnús Matthíasson**	Valur
1990-91	Teitur Örlygsson (3)	Njarðvík
1990-91	Valur Ingimundarson (4)	Tindastóll
1991-92	Guðmundur Bragason (3)	Grindavík
1991-92	Jón Kr. Gíslason (5)	Keflavík
1991-92	Pétur Guðmundsson*	Tindastóll
1991-92	**Teitur Örlygsson** (4)	Njarðvík
1991-92	Valur Ingimundarson (5)	Tindastóll
1992-93	Birgir Mikaelsson	Skallagrímur
1992-93	Guðmundur Bragason (4)	Grindavík
1992-93	**Jón Kr. Gíslason** (6)	Keflavík
1992-93	Magnús Matthíasson (2)	Valur
1992-93	Teitur Örlygsson (5)	Njarðvík
1993-94	Davíð Grissom	KR
1993-94	**Guðmundur Bragason** (5)	Grindavík
1993-94	Hjörtur Harðarson	Grindavík
1993-94	Jón Kr. Gíslason (7)	Keflavík
1993-94	Teitur Örlygsson (6)	Njarðvík
1994-95	Falur Harðarson (2)	KR
1994-95	Guðmundur Bragason (6)	Grindavík
1994-95	**Herbert Arnarson**	ÍR
1994-95	Kristinn Friðriksson	Þór Akureyri
1994-95	Teitur Örlygsson (7)	Njarðvík
1995-96	Guðmundur Bragason (7)	Grindavík
1995-96	Herbert Arnarson (2)	ÍR
1995-96	Hermann Hauksson	KR
1995-96	Jón Arnar Ingvarsson	Haukar
1995-96	**Teitur Örlygsson** (8)	Njarðvík
1996-97	Albert Óskarsson	Keflavík
1996-97	Alexander Ermolinskij	ÍA
1996-97	Falur Harðarson (3)	Keflavík
1996-97	Helgi Jónas Guðfinnsson	Grindavík
1996-97	**Hermann Hauksson** (2)	KR
1997-98	Falur Harðarson (4)	Keflavík
1997-98	Friðrik Stefánsson	KFÍ
1997-98	**Helgi Jónas Guðfinnsson** (2)	Grindavík
1997-98	Sigfús Gizurarson	Haukar
1997-98	Teitur Örlygsson (9)	Njarðvík
1998-99	Dagur Þórisson	ÍA
1998-99	**Falur Harðarson** (5)	Keflavík
1998-99	Friðrik Ragnarsson	Njarðvík
1998-99	Herbert Arnarson (3)	Grindavík
1998-99	Teitur Örlygsson (10)	Njarðvík
1999-00	Fannar Ólafsson	KR
1999-00	Friðrik Stefánsson (2)	Njarðvík
1999-00	Ólafur Jón Ormsson	KR
1999-00	Svavar Birgisson	Tindastóll
1999-00	**Teitur Örlygsson** (11)	Njarðvík
2000-01	Eiríkur Önundarson	ÍR
2000-01	Jón Arnór Stefánsson	KR
2000-01	Logi Gunnarsson	Njarðvík
2000-01	Óðinn Ásgeirsson	Þór Akureyri
2000-01	**Ólafur Jón Ormsson** (2)	KR
2001-02	Friðrik Stefánsson (3)	Njarðvík
2001-02	Hlynur Bæringsson	Skallagrímur
2001-02	**Jón Arnór Stefánsson** (2)	KR
2001-02	Óðinn Ásgeirsson (2)	Þór Akureyri
2001-02	Pálmi Freyr Sigurgeirsson	Breiðablik
2002-03	Damon Johnson	Keflavík
2002-03	Eiríkur Önundarson (2)	ÍR
2002-03	**Helgi Jónas Guðfinnsson** (3)	Grindavík
2002-03	Hlynur Bæringsson (2)	Snæfell
2002-03	Páll Axel Vilbergsson	Grindavík
2002-03	Páll Kristinsson	Njarðvík
2003-04	Hlynur Bæringsson (3)	Snæfell
2003-04	Lárus Jónsson	Hamar
2003-04	**Páll Axel Vilbergsson** (2)	Grindavík
2003-04	Páll Kristinsson (2)	Njarðvík
2003-04	Pálmi Freyr Sigurgeirsson (2)	Breiðablik
2004-05	Friðrik Stefánsson (4)	Njarðvík
2004-05	Hlynur Bæringsson (4)	Snæfell
2004-05	Magnús Þór Gunnarsson	Keflavík
2004-05	**Sigurður Þorvaldsson**	Snæfell
2004-05	Sævar Ingi Haraldsson	Haukar
2005-06	Fannar Ólafsson (2)	KR
2005-06	**Friðrik Stefánsson** (5)	Njarðvík
2005-06	Ingvaldur Magni Hafsteinsson	Snæfell
2005-06	Magnús Þór Gunnarsson (2)	Keflavík
2005-06	Páll Axel Vilbergsson (3)	Grindavík
2006-07	**Brenton Birmingham**	Njarðvík
2006-07	Friðrik Stefánsson (6)	Njarðvík
2006-07	Hlynur Bæringsson (5)	Snæfell
2006-07	Páll Axel Vilbergsson (4)	Grindavík
2006-07	Sigurður Þorvaldsson	Snæfell
2007-08	Brenton Birmingham	Njarðvík
2007-08	**Hlynur Bæringsson** (6)	Snæfell
2007-08	Hreggviður Magnússon	ÍR
2007-08	Páll Axel Vilbergsson (5)	Grindavík
2007-08	Sveinbjörn Claessen	ÍR
2008-09	Brenton Birmingham	Njarðvík
2008-09	Jakob Örn Sigurðarson	KR
2008-09	**Jón Arnór Stefánsson** (3)	KR
2008-09	Sigurður Gunnar Þorsteinsson	Keflavík
2008-09	Sigurður Þorvaldsson	Snæfell
2009-10	Brynjar Þór Björnsson	KR
2009-10	**Hlynur Bæringsson** (7)	Snæfell
2009-10	Hörður Vilhjálmsson	Keflavík
2009-10	Páll Axel Vilbergsson (6)	Grindavík
2009-10	Sigurður Þorvaldsson	Snæfell
2010-11	Brynjar Þór Björnsson	KR
2010-11	Hörður Vilhjálmsson (2)	Keflavík
2010-11	Jón Ólafur Jónsson	Snæfell
2010-11	**Pavel Ermolinskij**	KR
2010-11	Sigurður Gunnar Þorsteinsson (2)	Keflavík
2011-12	Finnur Atli Magnússon	KR
2011-12	Jón Ólafur Jónsson (2)	Snæfell
2011-12	**Justin Shouse**	Stjarnan
2011-12	Magnús Þór Gunnarsson (3)	Keflavík
2011-12	Sigurður Gunnar Þorsteinsson (3)	Grindavík
2012-13	Elvar Már Friðriksson	Njarðvík
2012-13	Jóhann Árni Ólafsson	Grindavík
2012-13	Jón Ólafur Jónsson (3)	Snæfell
2012-13	**Justin Shouse** (2)	Stjarnan
2012-13	Sigurður Gunnar Þorsteinsson (4)	Grindavík
2013-14	Elvar Már Friðriksson (2)	Njarðvík
2013-14	Helgi Már Magnússon	KR
2013-14	**Martin Hermannsson**	KR
2013-14	Pavel Ermolinskij (2)	KR
2013-14	Ragnar Ágúst Nathanaelsson	Þór Þorlákshöfn
2014-15	Darrel Lewis	Tindastóll
2014-15	Grétar Ingi Erlendsson	Þór Þorlákshöfn
2014-15	Helgi Már Magnússon (2)	KR
2014-15	Logi Gunnarsson (2)	Njarðvík
2014-15	**Pavel Ermolinskij** (3)	KR
2015-16	**Haukur Helgi Pálsson**	Njarðvík
2015-16	Helgi Már Magnússon (3)	KR
2015-16	Kári Jónsson	Haukar
2015-16	Pavel Ermolinskij (4)	KR
2015-16	Ragnar Ágúst Nathanaelsson (2)	Þór Þorlákshöfn
2016-17	Matthías Orri Sigurðarson	ÍR
2016-17	Logi Gunnarsson (3)	Njarðvík
2016-17	**Jón Arnór Stefánsson** (4)	KR
2016-17	Ólafur Ólafsson	Grindavík
2016-17	Hlynur Bæringsson (8)	Stjarnan
2017-18	Pétur Rúnar Birgisson	Tindastóll
2017-18	Sigtryggur Arnar Björnsson	Tindastóll
2017-18	Kári Jónsson (2)	Haukar
2017-18	**Kristófer Acox**	KR
2017-18	Hlynur Bæringsson (9)	Stjarnan
2018-19	Matthías Orri Sigurðarson (2)	ÍR
2018-19	Ægir Steinarsson	Stjarnan
2018-19	**Kristófer Acox** (2)	KR
2018-19	Hlynur Bæringsson (10)	Stjarnan
2018-19	Sigurður Þorsteinsson (5)	ÍR
2020-21	**Hörður Axel Vilhjálmsson** (3)	Keflavík
2020-21	Ægir Steinarsson (2)	Stjarnan
2020-21	Styrmir Snær Þrastarson	Þór Þorlákshöfn
2020-21	Kristófer Acox (3)	Valur
2020-21	Sigurður Þorsteinsson (6)	Höttur
2021-22	Hilmar Pétursson	Breiðablik
2021-22	Sigtryggur Arnar Björnsson (2)	Tindastóll
2021-22	Ólafur Ólafsson (2)	Grindavík
2021-22	**Kristófer Acox** (4)	Valur
2021-22	Sigurður Þorsteinsson (7)	Höttur
2022-23	**Kári Jónsson** (3)	Valur
2022-23	Sigtryggur Arnar Björnsson (3)	Tindastóll
2022-23	Ólafur Ólafsson (3)	Grindavík
2022-23	Styrmir Snær Þrastarson (2)	Þór Þorlákshöfn
2022-23	Kristófer Acox (5)	Valur
2023-24	**Kristinn Pálsson**	Valur
2023-24	Þórir Þorbjarnarson	Tindastóll
2023-24	Ægir Steinarsson (3)	Stjarnan
2023-24	Tómas Valur Þrastarson	Þór Þorlákshöfn
2023-24	Kristófer Acox (6)	Valur
2024-25	**Ægir Steinarsson** (4)	Stjarnan
2024-25	Hilmar Smári Henningsson	Stjarnan
2024-25	Þórir Þorbjarnarson (2)	KR
2024-25	Kristinn Pálsson (2)	Valur
2024-25	Haukur Helgi Pálsson (2)	Álftanes
