= Finnur Atli Magnússon =

Icelandic basketball player

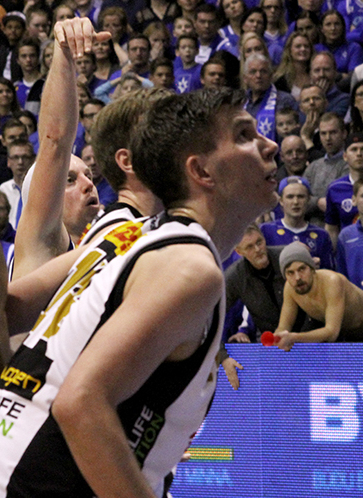
- Finnur Atli Magnússon in 2015.

KR-b
- Position: Center
- League: 2. deild karla

Personal information
- Born: 14 September 1985 (age 41) Reykjavík, Iceland
- Listed height: 206 cm (6 ft 9 in)

Career information
- High school: Wesleyan Christian Academy (High Point, North Carolina)
- College: Catawba (2005–2009)
- Playing career: 2002–present

Career history
- 2002–2004: KR-b
- 2009–2013: KR
- 2013–2014: Snæfell
- 2014–2015: KR
- 2015–2018: Haukar
- 2018–2020: KR
- 2018–2020: KR-b
- 2020–2021: Valur
- 2021–2022: Haukar
- 2022–present: KR-b

Career highlights
- Úrvalsdeild Domestic All-First Team (2012); 3× Icelandic champion (2011, 2015, 2019); Icelandic Cup (2011); Icelandic Super Cup (2014); Icelandic Company Cup (2014); 1. deild karla winner (2022)

Finnur Atli Magnússon (born 14 September 1985) is an Icelandic basketball player and a former member of the Icelandic men's national basketball team. He won the Icelandic championship as a member of KR in 2011, 2015 and 2019. In 2012, he was named to the Úrvalsdeild Domestic All-First Team.

== Playing career ==
=== College ===
Finnur played college basketball for Catawba College from 2005 to 2009.

=== Club career ===
Prior to joining Wesleyan Christian Academy in the United States in 2004, Finnur played for KR-b in the 2. deild karla and the Icelandic Basketball Cup from 2002 to 2004. Returning to Iceland in 2009, he rejoined KR, this time with the main team in the top-tier Úrvalsdeild. He helped the club to the 2011 Icelandic championship, scoring 20 points in the fourth and deciding game of the finals series against Stjarnan. In 2012, he was named to the Úrvalsdeild Domestic All-First Team after averaging 11.5 points and 7.7 rebounds during the season.

Finnur joined Snæfell in 2013. The season was a difficult one for Finnur as he battled an illness for most of it and averaged a career low 5.9 points and 3.4 rebounds. In July 2014, he rejoined KR again. During the 2014–2015 season, he helped KR the national championship, the Icelandic Super Cup and the Icelandic Company Cup.

In June 2015, Finnur left KR and signed with Haukar, siding his desire for more playing time. He helped Haukar to the 2016 Úrvalsdeild finals where they faced his former team, KR. In game 3 of the series, he sent the game to overtime with a step-back three pointer at the buzzer. Haukar won the game in overtime but eventually lost the series 1–3.

He had a strong 2017-2018 season, helping Haukar to the best record in the Úrvalsdeild and first seed in the playoffs. The season however ended on a disappointing node with Haukar being knocked out of the playoffs in the semi-finals by KR. Finnur left Haukar after the season and signed as a strength coach with Hungarian club Ceglédi EKK. He left the club in November that year and returned to Iceland. After playing one game for KR-b in the 2. deild karla on 11 November, he was called up to the main KR squad. On 2 May 2019, Finnur scored 15 points in 14 minutes in KR's game four victory against ÍR in the Úrvalsdeild finals.

On 4 May 2019 he won his 3rd national championship after KR beat ÍR in the Úrvalsdeild finals 3–2.

In February 2020, Finnur Atli left KR and joined rival Reykjavík club Valur.

In September 2021, Finnur Atli signed with 1. deild karla club Haukar. He helped Haukar finish first in the league and achieve promotion to the Úrvalsdeild. Prior to the last game of the season he announced that he would not go with the team to the Úrvalsdeild and would join KR-b in the 2. deild karla.

== National team career ==
Finnur Atli played 19 games for the Icelandic men's national basketball team from 2008 to 2012. He was part of the 16-man training group for Iceland's squad for EuroBasket 2015 but did not make the 12 man roster.

== Personal life ==
Finnur Atli is the younger brother of former Icelandic national team member Helgi Már Magnússon. He is engaged to 11 time Icelandic Basketball Player of the Year and national team player Helena Sverrisdóttir with whom he has one daughter.

== Awards and accomplishments ==
=== Club honours ===
- Icelandic Champion (3): 2011, 2015, 2019
- Icelandic Basketball Cup: 2011
- Icelandic Super Cup: 2014
- Icelandic Company Cup: 2014

=== Individual awards ===
- Úrvalsdeild Domestic All-First team: 2012
