= 2015–16 Úrvalsdeild karla =

Domino's deild karla^{1}
- Duration: 15 October 2015 – 28 April 2016
- Teams: 12
- TV partner(s): Stöð 2 Sport

Regular season
- Top seed: KR
- Relegated: FSu; Höttur

Finals
- Champions: KR (15th title)
- Runners-up: Haukar
- Finals MVP: (Iceland) Brynjar Þór Björnsson

Awards
- Domestic MVP: (Iceland) Haukur Helgi Pálsson
- Foreign MVP: (United States) Michael Craion

Statistical leaders
Points	(United States) Sherrod Nigel Wright	28.3
Rebounds	(United States) Christopher Woods	15.2
Assists	(Iceland) Ægir Steinarsson	6.8
- ^{1} Sponsored league name, referring to Úrvalsdeild karla.

The 2015–16 Úrvalsdeild karla was the 65th season of the Úrvalsdeild karla, the top tier basketball league in Iceland. The season started on October 15, 2015 and ended on April 29, 2016. KR defended its title by defeating Haukar 3–1 in the Finals.

== Competition format ==
The participating teams first played a conventional round-robin schedule with every team playing each opponent once "home" and once "away" for a total of 22 games. The top eight teams qualified for the championship playoffs whilst the two last qualified were relegated to Division 1.

== Regular season ==
Pos	Team	Pld	W	L	PF	PA	PD	Pts	Qualification
1	KR	22	18	4	2104	1746	+358	40	Qualification to Playoffs
2	Stjarnan	22	16	6	1911	1780	+131	38	Qualification to Playoffs
3	Keflavík	22	15	7	2160	2053	+107	37	Qualification to Playoffs
4	Haukar	22	15	7	1846	1671	+175	37	Qualification to Playoffs
5	Þór Þorl	22	14	8	1964	1825	+139	36	Qualification to Playoffs
6	Tindastóll	22	14	8	2010	1872	+138	36	Qualification to Playoffs
7	Njarðvík	22	11	11	1915	1878	+37	33	Qualification to Playoffs
8	Grindavík	22	9	13	1884	1992	−108	31	Qualification to Playoffs
9	Snæfell	22	8	14	1887	2106	−219	30	
10	ÍR	22	6	16	1713	1887	−174	28	
11	FSu	22	3	19	1804	2181	−377	25	Relegated
12	Höttur	22	3	19	1634	1841	−207	25	Relegated

Source: KKÍ

== Playoffs ==
Quarterfinals
1	KR	3
8	Grindavík	0
4	Haukar	3
5	Þór Þorl	1
(Pairings are reseeded after the first round)
2	Stjarnan	1
7	Njarðvík	3
3	Keflavík	1
6	Tindastóll	3

Semifinals
1	KR	3
7	Njarðvík	2
4	Haukar	3
6	Tindastóll	1

Final
1	KR	3
4	Haukar	1

== Awards ==
All official awards of the 2016–17 Úrvalsdeild karla season.

=== Domestic MVP ===
Pos.	Player	Team
SF	(Iceland) Haukur Helgi Pálsson	Njarðvík

=== Foreign MVP ===
Pos.	Player	Team
PF	(United States) Michael Craion	KR

=== Playoffs MVP ===
Pos.	Player	Team
SF	(Iceland) Brynjar Þór Björnsson	KR

=== Domestic All-First Team ===
Pos.	First Team	
Pos.	Player	Team
PG	(Iceland) Pavel Ermolinskij	KR
SG	(Iceland) Kári Jónsson	Haukar
SF	(Iceland) Haukur Helgi Pálsson	Njarðvík
PF	(Iceland) Helgi Már Magnússon	KR
C	(Iceland) Ragnar Nathanaelsson	Þór Þorlákshöfn

=== Coach of the Year ===
Coach	Team
(Iceland) Finnur Freyr Stefánsson	KR

=== Defensive Player of the Year ===
Pos.	Player	Team
SG	(Iceland) Darri Hilmarsson	KR

=== Young Player of the Year ===
Pos.	Player	Team
SG	(Iceland) Kári Jónsson	Haukar
