= Sigtryggur Arnar Björnsson =

Icelandic basketball player (born 1993)

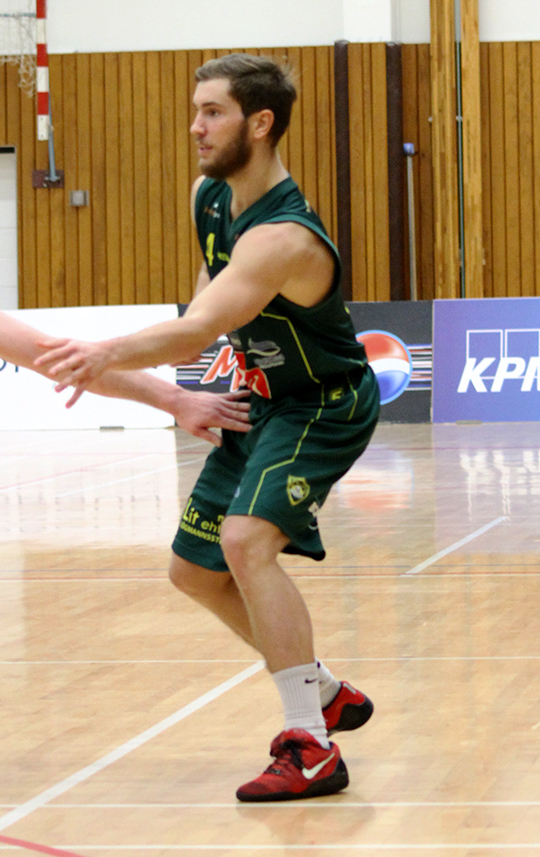
- Sigtryggur Arnar in 2015

Tindastóll
- Position: Guard
- League: Úrvalsdeild karla

Personal information
- Born: 7 March 1993 (age 33)
- Listed height: 180 cm (5 ft 11 in)

Career information
- High school: St. Mary's
- Playing career: 2012–present

Career history
- 2012: Breiðablik
- 2012–2013: Tindastóll
- 2014–2017: Skallagrímur
- 2017–2018: Tindastóll
- 2018–2021: Grindavík
- 2021: Real Canoe NC
- 2021: Básquet Coruña
- 2021–present: Tindastóll

Career highlights
- 2x Úrvalsdeild Domestic All-First Team (2018, 2022); Icelandic champion (2023); Icelandic Basketball Cup (2018); Icelandic Company Cup (2012); 1. deild karla Domestic MVP (2016)

Sigtryggur Arnar Björnsson (born 7 March 1993) is an Icelandic basketball player who plays for Tindastóll of the Úrvalsdeild karla and the Icelandic national basketball team. He won the Icelandic championship in 2023 and the Icelandic Cup in 2018 with Tindastóll.

== Career ==
=== Club career ===
After stints with Breiðablik, Tindastóll and St. Mary's High School in Canada, Sigtryggur had his breakout season with Skallagrímur during the 2014–2015 Úrvalsdeild karla season, averaging 16.7 points and 5.0 assists. Despite his performance, Skallagrímur was relegated to 1. deild karla after the season. He had a standout season in the 1. deild karla, helping Skallagrímur achieve promotion back to the Úrvalsdeild after averaging 21.0 points, 5.7 rebounds and 5.0 assist, and was named as the leagues Domestic Player of the Year. He continued his stellar play during the 2016-2017 season, averaging 18.0 points and 5.3 assists, and was called up to the Icelandic national team for the first time after the season. He was though once again unable to help Skallagrímur avoid religation and signed with Tindastóll during the off season.

On 15 December 2017, Sigtryggur was named to the All-First team of the first half of the 2017-2018 season On 10 January 2018, he scored 35 points in a victory against Haukar in the Icelandic Basketball Cup semi-finals. On 13 January 2018, he helped Tindastóll to its first major title when they beat KR in Icelandic Basketball Cup finals.

On 4 May 2018, Sigtryggur was named to the Úrvalsdeild Karla Domestic All-First Team.

On 3 July 2018, it was reported that Sigtryggur wanted to leave Tindastóll and join Grindavík, and that he considered his contract with the club not valid as the club did not send it to the Icelandic Basketball Federation within 30 days from its signing as the federations rules stipulated. The chairman of Tindastól in turn said that they viewed the contract as valid and that they expected Sigtryggur to report to the team for training camp before the season. The next day the clubs reported that they had reached an agreement and Sigtryggur signed with Grindavík later that day.

In February 2020, he helped Grindavík to the Icelandic Cup Finals where it lost to Stjarnan despite leading all scorers with 23 points.

In January 2021, Sigtryggur signed with LEB Oro club Real Canoe NC. In his debut he scored 11 points in 11 minutes in a victory against CB Almansa. In April 2021, he left Real Canoe and signed with Básquet Coruña.

In June 2021, Sigtryggur returned to Iceland and signed with Tindastóll and helped the team to the 2022 Úrvalsdeild finals where they lost to Valur 2–3.

In 2023, he won his first Icelandic championship after Tindastóll defeated Valur 3–2 in a finals rematch.

=== Icelandic national team ===
In July 2017, Sigtryggur was among the 24 players selected for the Icelandic national team training camp prior to EuroBasket 2017. He played his first national game on 27 July 2017, in a victory against Belgium . He made the cut to the final 15 players but was ultimately not named to the twelve man roster for Eurobasket.

In November 2017 Sigtryggur was named to the national team for the upcoming games in the 2019 FIBA Basketball World Cup qualification.

== Career statistics ==
=== National team ===
Team	Tournament	Pos.	GP	PPG	RPG	APG
Iceland	EuroBasket 2025	22nd	3	1.0	0.7	0.7

== Personal life ==
Sigtryggur's father, Björn Sigtryggsson, played six seasons in the Úrvalsdeild karla with Tindastóll, Breiðablik and Valur. His uncle, Ómar Sigmarsson, played nine seasons in the Úrvalsdeild, eight of them with Tindastóll and one with Hamar.
