= Brynjar Þór Björnsson =

Icelandic former basketball player

Brynjar Björnsson
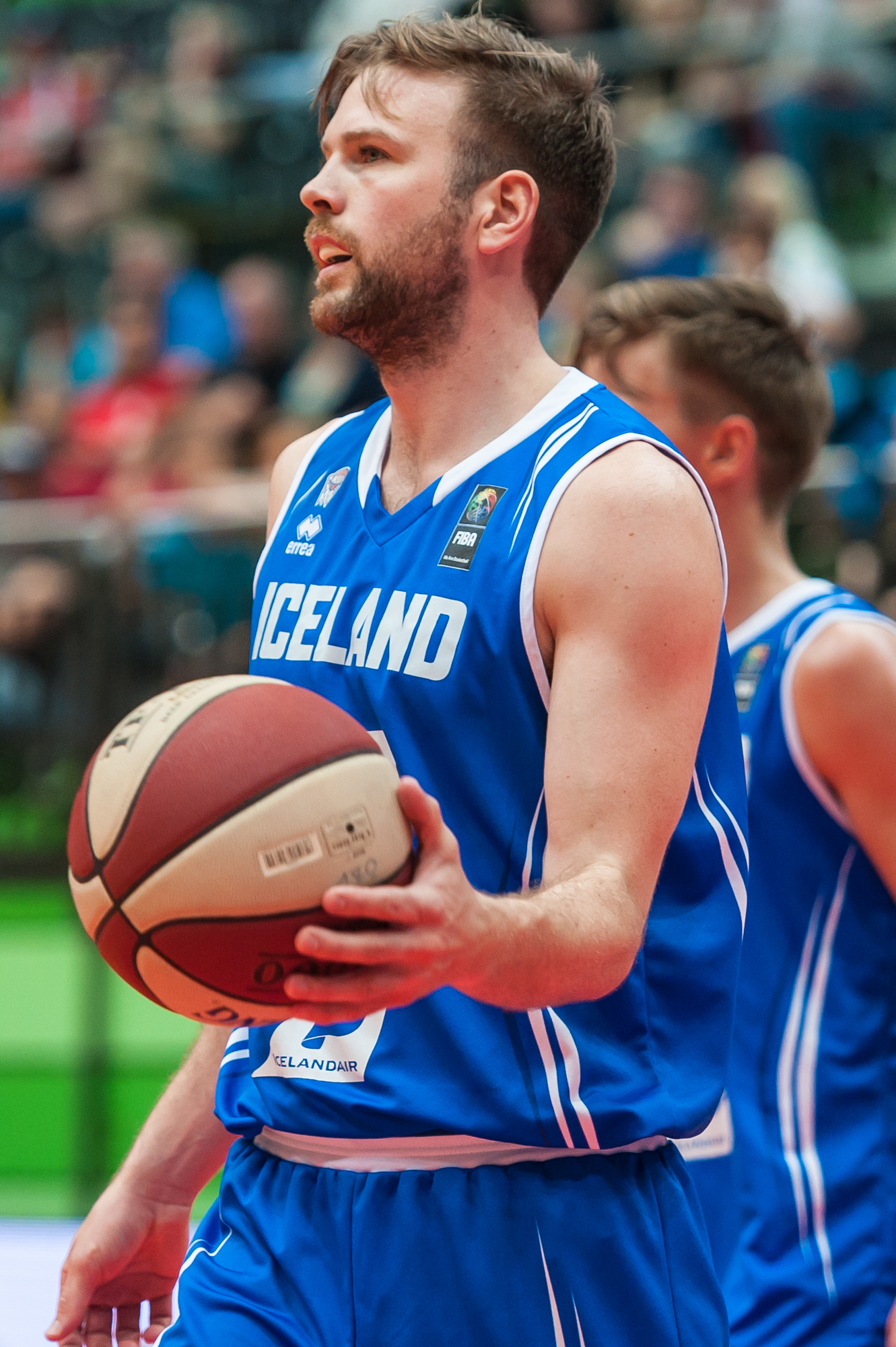

Personal information
- Born: 11 July 1988 (age 38) Reykjavík, Iceland
- Listed height: 1.88 m (6 ft 2 in)

Career information
- College: Francis Marion (2008–2009)
- Playing career: 2004–2022
- Position: Guard

Career history
- 2004-2011: KR
- 2011–2012: Jämtland Basket
- 2012–2018: KR
- 2018–2019: Tindastóll
- 2019–2022: KR
- 2022–present: KR-b

Career highlights
- Úrvalsdeild Playoffs MVP (2016); 2x Úrvalsdeild Domestic All-First team (2010, 2011); 8x Icelandic league champion (2007, 2009, 2011, 2014–2018); 3× Icelandic Basketball Cup (2011, 2016, 2017); 4× Icelandic Super Cup (2007, 2014, 2015, 2018)
Medals
Men's basketball
Representing Iceland
Games of the Small States of Europe
Bronze medal – third place	2013 Luxembourg	Team
Silver medal – second place	2015 Reykjavík	Team

Brynjar Þór Björnsson (born 11 July 1988) is an Icelandic basketball player and a former member of the Icelandic national team. He has won the Icelandic championship eight times and the Icelandic Basketball Cup three times with KR and is the club's all-time leader in scoring and games played.

== Playing career ==
=== Early career ===
In the fifth and deciding game of the 2007 Úrvalsdeild Finals against Snæfell, Brynjar made a three-point shot with 3 seconds left in regulation to tie the game at 68–68 and send it to overtime. KR prevailed in overtime, winning the game 76–74 and its tenth national championship.

=== College ===
Brynjar played for Francis Marion University from 2008 to 2009. He left the school in January 2009.

=== Sweden ===
In 2011, Brynjar joined Jämtland Basket of the Swedish Basketligan and for the season he averaged 10.4 points per game and made 40.8 percent of his three point shots.

=== Return to KR ===
He rejoined KR in 2012 and helped the club win the national championship four times in a row, from 2014 to 2017. He resigned with KR in 2017 after contemplating a move to Þór Akureyri.

On 10 November 2017 Brynjar became KR's all-time leading scorer in the Úrvalsdeild, surpassing Guðni Ólafur Guðnason who scored 3144 points for KR. On 12 March 2018 Brynjar broke a finger on practice and was expected to miss KR's first round playoff series against Njarðvík.

On 25 April 2018 Brynjar scored a buzzer beater to give KR a 75–77 victory against Tindastóll and a 2–1 lead in the Úrvalsdeild finals series. On 28 April he won his eight Icelandic championship after KR defeated Tindastóll in the fourth game of the series.

=== Tindastóll ===
On 8 June 2018 Brynjar left KR and signed with rivals Tindastóll. On 30 September, he won the Icelandic Super Cup after Tindastóll beat KR, 103–72. On 9 December Brynjar set the Úrvalsdeild record for most three-pointers made in a game when he made 16 of 31 three-point shots, on his way to 48 points, in a victory against Breiðablik, breaking Frank Booker's 27-year-old record. In April 2019, Tindastóll agreed to release him from his contract following the team's first round exit in the Úrvalsdeild playoffs.

=== Third stint with KR ===
On 29 June 2019, Brynjar returned to KR. On 5 March 2020 he announced he would not play in KR's upcoming game against Stjarnan due to the coronavirus pandemic in Iceland without consulting the team first. Shortly later, on 13 March 2020 with each team having one game left, the season was postponed, and later canceled due to the pandemic.

In August 2022, Brynjar announced his retirement from top-tier basketball.

== Icelandic national team ==
From 2007 to 2017, Brynjar played 68 games for the Icelandic national team. He retired from the national team in February 2018.

== Awards and accomplishments ==
=== Club honours ===
- Icelandic Champion (8): 2007, 2009, 2011, 2014, 2015, 2016, 2017, 2018
- Icelandic Basketball Cup (3): 2011, 2016, 2017
- Icelandic Super Cup (3): 2007, 2014, 2015, 2018
- Icelandic Company Cup (2): 2008, 2014

=== Individual awards ===
- Úrvalsdeild Domestic All-First team (2): 2010, 2011
- Úrvalsdeild Playoffs MVP : 2016
- Úrvalsdeild Young Player of the Year: 2005

== Personal life ==
Brynjar is the son of Björn M. Björgvinsson, the former chairman of the Icelandic Basketball Association.
