= Ólafur Ólafsson =

Icelandic basketball player (born 1990)

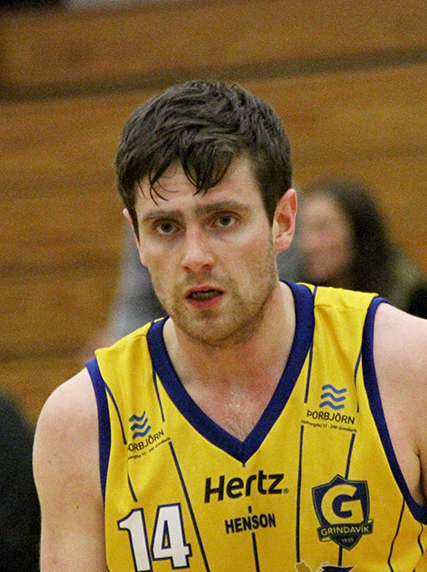
- Ólafur in 2015.

No. 14 – Grindavík
- Position: Forward
- League: Úrvalsdeild karla

Personal information
- Born: 28 November 1990 (age 35) Grindavík, Iceland
- Listed height: 196 cm (6 ft 5 in)
- Listed weight: 88 kg (194 lb)

Career information
- Playing career: 2005–present

Career history
- 2005–2008: Grindavík
- 2008–2009: Eisbären Bremerhaven
- 2009–2015: Grindavík
- 2015–2016: St. Clement
- 2016–present: Grindavík

Career highlights
- 3× Icelandic League champion (2012, 2013, 2026); Icelandic Basketball Cup (2014); 2× Úrvalsdeild Domestic All-First Team (2017, 2022)
Medals
Men's basketball
Representing Iceland
Games of the Small States of Europe
Bronze medal – third place	2017 San Marino	Team
Bronze medal – third place	2019 Montenegro	Team

Ólafur Ólafsson (born 28 November 1990) is an Icelandic basketball player for Úrvalsdeild karla club Grindavík, and a member of the Icelandic national team. Known for his high energy, explosiveness and strength, he won back-to-back national championships with Grindavík in 2012 and 2013 and the Icelandic Cup in 2014.

== Playing career ==
Ólafur came up through the junior ranks of Grindavík and played his first senior game during the 2005-2006 Úrvalsdeild karla season. He soon became known for his jumping ability and won the Icelandic All-star game dunk contest in 2008. He spent the 2008–2009 season in Germany with Eisbären Bremerhaven before returning to Grindavík in 2009. He helped Grindavík win the national championship in 2012 and 2013, and the Icelandic Basketball Cup in 2014.

Ólafur joined St. Clement in the French NM2 in 2015 where he averaged 14 points per game. He rejoined Grindavík in June 2016.

Ólafur was named to the Úrvalsdeild Domestic All-First Team in 2017.

He helped Grindavík to the Icelandic Cup Finals in February 2020 where it lost to Stjarnan despite Ólafur's 20 points.

On 2 May 2021, he scored a game winning three pointer at the buzzer from behind the half-court line against KR. On 5 November 2022, he had 9 steals in a victory against Njarðvík.

On 16 December 2022, Ólafur scored 32 points, including career high 8 three pointers, in a 78–81 victory against Haukar.

On 18 May 2026, he won his third national championship after Grindavík defeated Tindastóll in the Úrvalsdeild finals, 3–1.

== National team ==
Ólafur has been a member of the Icelandic national team since 2011. He was a member of the team that won bronze at the 2017 Games of the Small States of Europe.

== Personal life ==
Ólafur's father was Ólafur Þór Jóhannsson, former vice-chairman of the Icelandic Basketball Association.

== Awards, titles and accomplishments ==
=== Individual awards ===
- Úrvalsdeild Domestic All-First Team : 2017

=== Titles ===
- Icelandic champion (2): 2012, 2013
- Icelandic Basketball Cup: 2014
- Icelandic Supercup (3): 2011, 2012, 2013
- Icelandic Company Cup (2): 2009, 2011

=== Accomplishments ===
- Icelandic All-Star Game dunk contest winner: 2008, 2010
