= Andrée Michelsson =

Swedish-Icelandic basketball player

Personal information
- Born: February 23, 1997 (age 29) Malmö, Sweden
- Listed height: 1.88 m (6 ft 2 in)
- Listed weight: 84 kg (185 lb)

Career information
- Playing career: 2015–present
- Position: Guard

Career history
- 2015–2016: Malbas Oresund
- 2016–2017: Snæfell
- 2017–2019: Höttur
- 2019–2020: Sindri
- 2021–2022: Rendsburg Twisters
- 2023: Magic Chieti Basket
- 2023–2024: Al-Ittihad

Andrée Fares Michelsson (born 23 February 1997) is a Swedish-Icelandic basketball player who last played for Al-Ittihad SC Aleppo of the Syrian Basketball League. In 2023, he received a Syrian citizenship and debuted with the Syria national basketball team.

== Early life ==
Andrée was born in the Videdal district of Malmö, Sweden, to an Icelandic mother, Hulda Georgsdóttir, and a Syrian-Swedish father, Michel Kizaw. He grew up in the district of Videdal in Malmö and started playing basketball with Malbas at the age of ten.

== Career ==
At the age of 17, Andrée received a scholarship offer from Saint Andrew's High School but fractured his foot three days later during a U-20 match with Malbas.

=== Club career ===
Andrée played his first senior games with Malbas Oresund and appeared in four games in the Basketligan during the 2015–16 season.

In 2016, Andrée moved to Snæfell of the Icelandic Úrvalsdeild karla. For the season he averaged 11.7 points per game, with his best game coming against Skallagrímur where he scored 34 points in a 112–115 overtime loss. Snæfell did though not fare well in the league, being relegated at the end of the season after failing to register a win.

In August 2017, Andrée signed with newly promoted Höttur. On 26 January 2018, Höttur won their first victory of the season, defeating Þór Akureyri 86–75 in overtime. It was his first league victory in the Úrvalsdeild karla in thirty-six tries. At the end of the season, Höttur was relegated to 1. deild karla. For the season he averaged 8.9 points and 1.6 assists.

In June 2018, he resigned with Höttur for the 2018–19 1. deild karla season. On 12 October 2018, he scored a career high 37 points against Snæfell. During the regular season, he averaged 12.9 points per game but in the playoffs his performance dropped to 6.0 points per game.

In July 2019, Andrée signed with 1. deild karla club Ungmennafélagið Sindri. On 27 February 2020, he scored a season high 34 points against Breiðablik. In 17 regular season games, he averaged a career high 18.8 points, 3.6 rebounds and 2.3 assists per game for Sindri.

After sitting out the 2020–2021 season, Andrée signed with the Rendsburg Twisters of the German 1. Regionalliga. In his debut with the Twisters, he scored 29 points in a victory against TSG Bergedorf Stargazers. On 8 January 2022, Andrée had 41 points and 15 assists in a double-overtime win against SC Rasta Vechta. For the season he averaged 21.4 points and 4.3 assists in 20 games.

For the 2022–2023 season, Andrée signed with Magic Chieti Basket of the Italian Serie C Gold.

Following his stint in Italy, Andrée signed with Al-Ittihad SC Aleppo of the Syrian Basketball League.

=== National team career ===
Andrée was called up to the Swedish national U-16 team where he won gold during the 2013 Scania Cup. In December 2016, he was called up to the 25-man training group for the Icelandic national U-20 team.

In 2023, he debuted with the Syria national basketball team.
