= Dabbi Kóngur =

Dabbi Kóngur (English: King Dabbi) may refer to:

- Davíð Oddsson (born 1948), Icelandic politician, Prime Minister of Iceland from 1991 to 2004
- Davíð Arnar Ágústsson (born 1996), Icelandic basketball player
