= Styrmir Snær Þrastarson =

Icelandic basketball player (born 2001)

Rapid București
- Position: Shooting guard / small forward
- League: Liga Națională

Personal information
- Born: 2 August 2001 (age 24) Reykjavík, Iceland
- Listed height: 201 cm (6 ft 7 in)
- Listed weight: 90.5 kg (200 lb)

Career information
- College: Davidson (2021–2022)
- Playing career: 2016–present

Career history
- 2016–2021: Þór Þorlákshöfn
- 2019–2020: → Hamar
- 2022–2023: Þór Þorlákshöfn
- 2023–2025: Belfius Mons-Hainaut
- 2025–2026: CB Zamora
- 2026–present: Rapid București

Career highlights
- Icelandic champion (2021); 2× Icelandic Super Cup (2016, 2017); Úrvalsdeild Domestic All-First Team (2021); Úrvalsdeild Young Player of the Year (2021)

Styrmir Snær Þrastarson (anglicised to Snaer Thrastarson; born 2 August 2001) is an Icelandic basketball player. He plays for Icelandic national team. In 2021 he won the Icelandic championship with Þór Þorlákshöfn.

== Playing career ==
=== Þór Þorlákshöfn ===
Styrmir started his senior team career with Þór Þorlákshöfn during the 2016–2017 season and won the Icelandic Super Cup in both 2016 and 2017. During the 2019–20 season, he was loaned to 1. deild karla club Hamar where he went on to average 10.2 points and 5.3 rebounds in 9 games.

Styrmir had his break out season for Þór in 2020–2021 where he was routinely assigned to guard the opponent's best player. On 5 March 2021, he scored a career high 32 points in a victory against Haukar. In 21 regular season games, he averaged 14.6 points, six rebounds and 3.3 assists per game. In the first round of the playoffs, Styrmir averaged 15.8 points, seven rebounds and five assists in Þorlákshöfn's 3–1 series win against Þór Akureyri. In the quarterfinals, he led Þór to a 3–2 series win against Stjarnan, averaging 17.4 points, 6.6 rebounds and 2.8 assists. He had three 20-plus points games in the series, including a 21-point performance in the fifth and deciding game. On 25 June 2021 he helped Þór win the national championship for the first time after it beat Keflavík 3–1 in the Úrvalsdeild finals. Following the season, he was named the Úrvalsdeild Young Player of the Year and to the Úrvalsdeild Domestic All-First Team.

=== Davidson College ===
In July 2021, Styrmir joined Davidson College. He played sparingly during his freshman season, appearing in 13 games, averaging 1.1 points in 3.3 minutes per game.

=== Return to Iceland ===
In October 2022, Styrmir left Davidson and rejoined Þór Þorlákshöfn. In 30 games, he averaged 17.0 points, 6.4 rebounds and 5.3 assists per game.

=== BNXT League ===
In June 2023, he signed with Belfius Mons-Hainaut of the BNXT League.

=== Spain ===
Styrmir signed with CB Zamora ahead of the 2025–26 Primera FEB season.

In July 2026, he signed with Rapid București of the Liga Națională.

== National team career ==
After playing for Iceland's junior national teams, Styrmir was selected to the Icelandic senior national team for the first time in February 2021.

== Awards and accomplishments ==
=== Club honours ===
- Icelandic championship : 2021
- Icelandic Super Cup (2): 2016, 2017

=== Individual awards ===
- Úrvalsdeild Domestic All-First Team: 2021
- Úrvalsdeild Young Player of the Year: 2021

== Career statistics ==
Legend
GP	Games played	GS	Games started	MPG	Minutes per game
FG%	Field goal percentage	3P%	3-point field goal percentage	FT%	Free throw percentage
RPG	Rebounds per game	APG	Assists per game	SPG	Steals per game
BPG	Blocks per game	PPG	Points per game	**Bold**	Career high

=== National team ===
Team	Tournament	Pos.	GP	PPG	RPG	APG
Iceland	EuroBasket 2025	22nd	5	4.0	3.4	0.2

=== College ===
Year	Team	GP	GS	MPG	FG%	3P%	FT%	RPG	APG	SPG	BPG	PPG
2021–22	Davidson	13	0	3.3	.400	.333	.500	.7	.3	.0	.1	1.1
