= Finnur Freyr Stefánsson =

Icelandic professional basketball coach (born 1983)

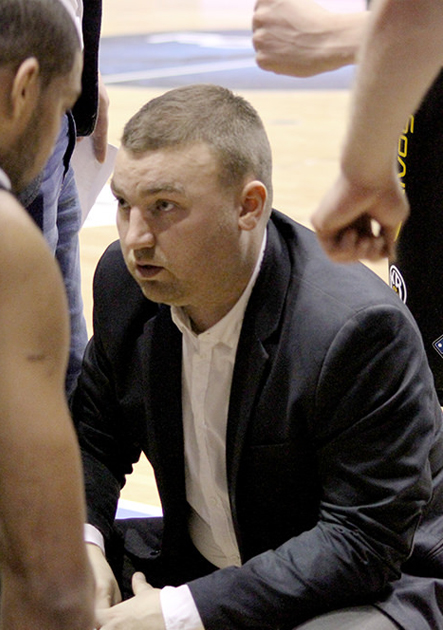

Valur
- Position: Head coach
- League: Úrvalsdeild karla

Personal information
- Born: 29 October 1983 (age 43) Iceland

Career history

Coaching
- 2004–2008: KR (men's) (assistant)
- 2013–2014: KR (women's)
- 2014–2018: KR (men's)
- 2014–2020: Iceland (men's) (assistant)
- 2014–2017: Iceland men's U20
- 2017: Iceland (men's)
- 2019: Valur (women's) (assistant)
- 2019: Iceland (men's)
- 2019–2020: Horsens IC
- 2020–present: Valur (men's)

Career highlights
- As coach: 7× Icelandic men's league champion (2014–2018, 2022, 2024); 4× Icelandic Men's Basketball Cup (2016, 2017, 2023, 2025); 4× Icelandic Men's Supercup (2014, 2015, 2022, 2023); 3× Úrvalsdeild karla coach of the year (2014, 2016, 2018); As assistant coach: Icelandic men's league champion (2007); Icelandic Men's Supercup (2007)
Medals
Head Coach for Iceland
men's national basketball team
Games of the Small States of Europe
| Bronze medal – third place | 2017 San Marino | Team |
| Bronze medal – third place | 2019 Montenegro | Team |

Finnur Freyr Stefánsson (born 29 October 1983) is an Icelandic professional basketball coach. With KR, he won the Icelandic championship five years in a row from 2014 to 2018 and the Icelandic Men's Basketball Cup in 2016 and 2017. He has served as an assistant coach to the Icelandic men's national basketball team from 2014, helping the team to EuroBasket 2015 and EuroBasket 2017.

== Coaching career ==
=== Club career ===
Finnur started his coaching career as an assistant to Herbert Arnarson on KR men's team in 2004 and served there until 2008. He was the head coach of the KR women's team during the 2012-2013 season and in 2013, he was hired as the head coach of the KR men's team. On 30 April 2017 he won the Icelandic championship with KR for the fourth consecutive season, earning him the nickname "Finnur sem allt vinnur" (English: "Finn(ur) that everything Wins"). Finnur was named coach of the year in the Úrvalsdeild karla in 2014 and 2016.

On 28 April 2018, Finnur won his fifth straight Icelandic championship after KR defeated Tindastóll in the Úrvalsdeild finals. After the season he was named the Úrvalsdeild Karla Coach of the Year for the third time in his career. On 5 June 2018, KR announced that Finnur had decided to step down as head coach.

In August 2018, Finnur was hired as a junior team coach with Valur. On 14 April 2019, Finnur guided the Valur women's team in game four of its semi-finals playoffs series against KR in the absence of head coach Darri Freyr Atlason, who was serving a one game suspension. Valur won the game and advanced to the Úrvalsdeild finals.

In June 2019, Finnur was hired as the head coach of Horsens IC of the Danish Basketligaen. He guided the team to the Danish Cup finals where it lost to the Bakken Bears in February 2020. He left the club in May 2020 after the season had been canceled due to the coronavirus pandemic in Denmark.

On 4 May 2020, Finnur Freyr was hired as the head coach of Valur men's team with a two-year contract. On 18 May 2022 he won his sixth national championship after Valur defeated Tindastóll in the Úrvalsdeild finals.

On 2 October 2022, he won the Icelandic Super Cup with Valur.

On 14 January 2023, he guided Valur to its first Icelandic Cup win in 40 years, after the team defeated Stjarnan in the Cup final. He led Valur to a Úrvalsdeild finals rematch against Tindastóll but this time the Tindastóll came out on top, winning the series 3–2.

On 24 September 2023, he won the Icelandic Super Cup again after Valur defeated Tindastóll 80–72.

On 22 March 2025, he won the Icelandic Cup after Valur defeated KR in the Cup finals, 96–78.

=== National basketball team ===
In 2014, Finnur was hired as an assistant coach to Craig Pedersen for the Icelandic men's national basketball team, and as the head coach of the Icelandic men's national under-20 basketball team.

Finnur served as head coach of the men's national team during the 2017 Games of the Small States of Europe.

He stepped down as the head coach of the U-20 team on 28 July 2017, after leading them to an 8th-place finish at the 2017 FIBA Europe Under-20 Championship.

In February 2018 Finnur came under heavy criticism after five Haukar players were selected to a short 20-player training camp, the day before Haukar met KR in an important regular season game on February 18. No KR players were selected to the camp which aimed to help the coaching staff select two players for the remaining rosters spots prior to Iceland's games against Finland and the Czech Republic in the 2019 FIBA Basketball World Cup qualification later that month. Iceland's national team head coach, Craig Pedersen came to Finnur's defence, stating that himself had the final say in player selections, not Finnur. Due to the criticism and the Icelandic Basketball Federation silence on the matter, Finnur stated that he was contemplating resigning from the national team.

On 13 September 2018, Finnur was hired as the manager of Iceland's junior national teams program. In May 2019, he was slated to head the team during its games at the Games of the Small States of Europe.

== Honours ==
=== Club ===
- Icelandic men's league champion: 2007^{1},2014, 2015, 2016, 2017, 2018, 2022, 2024
- Icelandic Men's Basketball Cup: 2016, 2017, 2023, 2025
- Icelandic Men's Supercup: 2007^{1}, 2014, 2015, 2022, 2023
- Icelandic Men's Company Cup: 2014

=== Individual ===
- Úrvalsdeild karla coach of the year: 2014, 2016, 2018

^{1} As assistant coach.
