= Kári Jónsson =

Icelandic basketball player (born 1997)

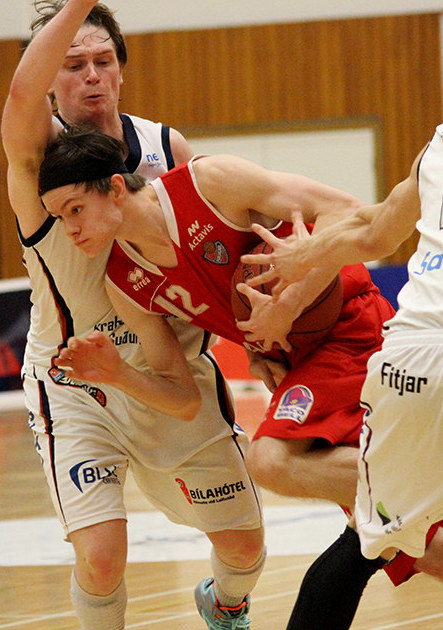
- Kári in a 2015 game against Keflavík

Valur
- Position: Point guard
- League: Úrvalsdeild karla

Personal information
- Born: 27 August 1997 (age 29) Reykjavík, Iceland
- Listed height: 1.91 m (6 ft 3 in)
- Listed weight: 77 kg (170 lb)

Career information
- College: Drexel (2016–2017)
- Playing career: 2013–present

Career history
- 2013–2016: Haukar
- 2017–2018: Haukar
- 2018–2019: Barça Lassa B
- 2019–2020: Haukar
- 2020–2021: Bàsquet Girona
- 2021–present: Valur

Career highlights
- Úrvalsdeild Domestic MVP (2023); Úrvalsdeild Playoffs MVP (2022); Icelandic Cup Finals MVP (2023); 3× Úrvalsdeild Domestic All-First team (2016, 2018, 2023); Úrvalsdeild Young Player of the Year (2016); 2× Icelandic League champion (2022, 2024); 2× Icelandic Cup (2023, 2025); Icelandic Super Cup (2022)
Medals
Men's basketball
Representing Iceland
Games of the Small States of Europe
Bronze medal – third place	2017 San Marino	Team

Kári Jónsson (born 27 August 1997) is an Icelandic basketball player who plays for Valur in the Úrvalsdeild karla. He was named to the Úrvalsdeild Domestic All-First team in 2016 when he helped Haukar to the Úrvalsdeild finals where they lost to KR. In 2022, he won his first Icelandic championship and was named the Úrvalsdeild Playoffs MVP. In 2023, he won the Icelandic Cup for the first time and was named the Cup Final MVP.

== Playing career ==
=== First years ===
Kári came up from the junior ranks of Haukar and played his first games with the senior team in the 2013–2014 season, averaging 7.6 points in 25 regular season and playoffs games. The next season he moved to the starting lineup and averaged 15.0 points in 21 regular-season games. He averaged 13.0 points in 9 playoffs games, helping Haukar to the semi-finals where they lost to Tindastóll. He had his breakout season in 2015–2016 and was named the best player of the second half of the season before the playoffs. He helped Haukar advance to the Úrvalsdeild finals but was injured in the first game and missed the rest of the series which Haukar eventually lost 1–3. After the season he was named the Úrvalsdeild Young Player of the Year and to the Úrvalsdeild Domestic All-First team.

=== College ===
Kári joined Drexel University in 2016. On 26 December, he was named CAA Rookie of the week after scoring 17 points, including 5 three-pointers, and handing out 8 assists in a game against Quinnipiac University. For the season he averaged 10.1 points and 2.0 assists, starting 21 of 28 games. He led the CAA by making 43.6% of his three-point shots.

He left Drexel in October 2017 prior to the start of the 2017–2018 college season, for personal reasons.

=== Return to Iceland ===
On 13 October 2017 Kári signed with his former team, Haukar, for the rest of the 2017–18 season. On February 20, Kári broke his right thumb on a practice with the Icelandic national team, and was expected to miss up to 4 weeks, including the national team games and the final three games of the regular season. On March 8, Haukar defeated Valur in the last game of the regular season and finished with the best record in the league, winning the Division championship and a home court advantage through the playoffs. For the regular season, he averaged 19.8 points, 4.5 rebounds and 5.1 assists per game.

In the first round of the playoffs, Haukar faced Keflavík. During game two of the series on 20 March 2018, Kári scored 6 of his 27 points in the last 3.4 seconds in game, giving Haukar an 82–85 victory. After being fouled in the act of shooting with 3.4 seconds remaining, he made all three free throws and tied the game at 82–82. After a timeout by Keflavík, Haukar stole the inbound pass, allowing Kári to heave up a cross-court shot from his own free throw line that went in, winning the game for Haukar. After losing game the next to game, Haukar won the series with a 72–66 victory in game five. In the semi-finals, Haukar lost to eventual champions KR in four games. For the playoffs, Kári averaged 20.2 points, 4.7 rebounds and 4.6 assists per game. Following the season, Kári was named to the Úrvalsdeild Karla Domestic All-First Team.

=== Barça Lassa B ===
On 3 August 2018 Kári signed a one-year deal with Barça Lassa B of the LEB Oro. On 15 November it was reported that he would miss three months due to an Achilles tendon injury. Surgery was performed on both his ankles to remove a portion of his heelbones, to alleviate the pain it was causing to his Achilles tendons. Due to the injuries he was forced to miss the rest of the season.

=== Helsinki Seagulls ===
In August 2019, Kári signed with Helsinki Seagulls of the Finnish Korisliiga. On 6 September, the Seagulls terminated their contract with Kári, before the start of the season, as he was not yet fully recovered from his injuries.

=== Haukar 2019–2020 ===
On 10 September 2019, Kári signed back with his hometown team of Haukar. For the season, he averaged 17.0 points, 3.5 rebounds and 6.8 assists before the last game and the playoffs were canceled due to the COVID-19 pandemic in Iceland. After contemplating overseas opportunities, he resigned with Haukar on 15 September 2020. He appeared in one game for Haukar, scoring 27 points, before the season was delayed due to the coronavirus pandemic in Iceland.

=== Bàsquet Girona 2020–2021 ===
In December 2020, Haukar agreed to release Kári from his contract so he could sign with LEB Oro club Bàsquet Girona. In 19 games, he averaged 7.2 points, 1.6 rebounds and 1.4 assists in 19.2 minutes per game.

=== Valur 2021–present ===
In August 2021, Kári returned to the Úrvalsdeild and signed with Reykjavík club Valur. In April 2022, he helped Valur advance to the Úrvalsdeild finals for the first time in 30 years. On 18 May 2022, he won his first Icelandic championship and was named the Úrvalsdeild Playoffs MVP after Valur defeated Tindastóll in the finals.

On 14 January 2023, he won the Icelandic Cup and was named the Cup Finals MVP after turning in 22 points and 7 assists in Valur's win against Stjarnan. He led Valur to a Finals rematch against Tindastóll, but this time Tindastóll came out on top, winning the series 3–2. Following the season he was named the Úrvalsdeild Domestic Player of the Year and to the Úrvalsdeild Domestic All-First team.

In December 2023, Valur announced that Kári would miss several months of playing time due to an injury that required surgery.

On 22 March 2025, he won the Icelandic Cup for the second time, after Valur defeated KR in the Cup finals, 96–78.

==== The 0.4 shot ====
On 11 April 2026, Valur faced Keflavík in the first round of the playoffs. In game three, Valur was down 76–78 after Remy Martin gave Keflavík the lead with 0.4 seconds left of the game. After a timeout, Lazar Nikolic inbounded the ball to Kári in the corner who managed to get off a shot before the clock expired and score the winning three point basket, giving Valur a 2–1 lead in the series.

== Icelandic national team ==
Kári played 5 games for the Icelandic national team at the 2017 Games of the Small States of Europe, helping the team win the bronze.

In 2015, Kári was named the MVP of the U-18 Nordic Championship after averaging 17.8 points and 6.0, and leading Iceland to a second-place finish.

In 2016, Kári led Iceland's U-20 team to silver on the 2016 FIBA Europe Under-20 Championship Division B and was named to the All-Tournament Team. He played for the U-20 team at the 2017 FIBA Europe Under-20 Championship, helping them advance from the group stage to the Second Round of 16. There he scored 15 points in Iceland's 39–73 win against Sweden. In the Round of 8, Iceland lost to Serbia and eventually finished 8th in the tournament.

== Career statistics ==
=== National team ===
Team	Tournament	Pos.	GP	PPG	RPG	APG
Iceland	EuroBasket 2025	22nd	5	2.6	0.4	0.8

== Personal life ==
Kári is the son of Jón Arnar Ingvarsson, a former professional player and coach, who played 102 games for the Icelandic national basketball team. His nephew, Pétur Ingvarsson, played 26 games for the national team while his grandfather, Ingvar Jónsson, both played for and coached Haukar.

== Awards and accomplishments ==
=== Titles ===
- Icelandic champion (2): 2022, 2024
- Icelandic Cup (2): 2023, 2025
- Icelandic Super Cup (2) :2022, 2023

=== Individual awards ===
- Úrvalsdeild Domestic Player of the Year : 2023
- Úrvalsdeild Playoffs MVP: 2022
- Úrvalsdeild Domestic All-First team (3): 2016, 2018, 2023
- Icelandic Cup Finals MVP: 2023
- Úrvalsdeild Young Player of the Year: 2016
- FIBA Europe U-20 Championship Division B All-Tournament Team : 2016
- U-18 Nordic Championship's MVP: 2015
