= Vilbergsson =

Vilbergsson is a surname. Notable people with the surname include:

- Jóhann Vilbergsson (born 1935), Icelandic alpine skier
- Páll Axel Vilbergsson (born 1978), Icelandic basketball player
