= Magnús Þór Gunnarsson =

Icelandic basketball player (born 1981)

Keflavík-b
- Position: Guard
- League: 2. deild karla

Personal information
- Born: 7 February 1981 (age 45)
- Listed height: 186 cm (6 ft 1 in)

Career information
- Playing career: 1998–2020
- Number: 10, 32

Career history

Playing
- 1998–2008: Keflavík
- 2008–2010: Njarðvík
- 2010: Aabyhøj
- 2010–2011: Njarðvík
- 2011–2014: Keflavík
- 2014: Grindavík
- 2015: Skallagrímur
- 2015–2016: Keflavík
- 2016–2017: Skallagrímur
- 2017–2018: Njarðvík-b
- 2019: Keflavík
- 2019–2020: Reynir Sandgerði
- 2021–present: Keflavík-b

Coaching
- 2018–2019: Keflavík (assistant)

Career highlights
- As player: 3x Úrvalsdeild Domestic All-First Team (2005, 2006, 2012); 5x Icelandic champion (1999, 2003–2005, 2008); 3× Icelandic Basketball Cup (2003, 2004, 2012); Icelandic Supercup (2003); As assistant coach: Icelandic Women's Super Cup (2018)
Medals
Men's basketball
Representing Iceland
Games of the Small States of Europe
Silver medal – second place	2001 San Marino	National Team
Silver medal – second place	2003 Malta	National Team
Silver medal – second place	2005 Andorra	National Team
Gold medal – first place	2007 Monaco	National Team

Magnús Þór Gunnarsson (born 7 February 1981) is an Icelandic basketball player who played twenty seasons in the Úrvalsdeild karla. He won the Icelandic championship five times and the Icelandic basketball cup three times.

== Icelandic national team ==
Magnús played 77 games for the Icelandic national basketball team from 2001 to 2013, and was for a time the team's captain.

== Controversies ==
On February 24, 2014, in a game between Keflavík and KR, Magnús elbowed KR's Brynjar Þór Björnsson in the face and as a result received a one-game suspension. On November 6, the same year, he once again struck against Brynjar while he was driving to the basket, sending him flying out of bounds. Magnús was ejected from the game and later received a two-game suspension.

== Coaching career ==
On 28 August 2018, Magnús was hired as an assistant coach to Jón Guðmundsson of Úrvalsdeild kvenna club Keflavík. On 30 September 2018, he won the Icelandic Women's Super Cup with Keflavík.

== Titles and awards ==
=== Titles ===
- 5x Icelandic champion (1999, 2003–2005, 2008)
- 3× Icelandic Basketball Cup (2003, 2004, 2012)
- Icelandic Supercup (2003)
- 3x Icelandic Company Cup (2002, 2006, 2013)

=== Awards ===
- 3x Úrvalsdeild Domestic All-First Team (2005, 2006, 2012)
