= Davíð Arnar Ágústsson =

Icelandic basketball player (born 1996)

Þór Þorlákshöfn
- Position: Forward
- League: Úrvalsdeild karla

Personal information
- Born: 5 November 1996 (age 30) Þorlákshöfn, Iceland
- Listed height: 194 cm (6 ft 4 in)
- Listed weight: 95 kg (209 lb)

Career information
- Playing career: 2012–present
- Number: 13
- Coaching career: 2026–present

Career history

Playing
- 2012–present: Þór Þorlákshöfn

Coaching
- 2026–present: Þór Þorlákshöfn (w)

Career highlights
- Icelandic championship (2021); 3× Icelandic Super Cup winner (2016, 2017, 2021)

Davíð Arnar Ágústsson (born 5 November 1996) is an Icelandic basketball player who plays for Úrvalsdeild karla club Þór Þorlákshöfn. Nicknamed Dabbi Kóngur (English: King Dabbi), he helped Þór Þorlákshöfn win its first ever national championship in 2021.

== Playing career ==
=== Club career ===
After starting his senior team career during the 2012–13 season, Davíð first made the spotlight after starting the 2015–16 season by making 14 out of his first 19 three point shots, earning him the nickname Dabbi Kóngur. On 22 October 2015 when made seven out of eight three point shots, on his way to 21 points, in a victory against Tindastóll. Two games later, he made five out of seven three point shots in a victory against ÍR.

Davíð helped Þór to the Icelandic Cup finals in both 2016 and 2017, where they lost to KR both times. Both years, Þór also faced KR in the Icelandic Super Cup, winning both times.

After being expected to battle relegation, Þór started the 2020–21 season hot and finished second in the league, behind powerhouse Keflavík. They then went on to beat Þór Akureyri and Stjarnan in the first two rounds of the playoffs, before unexpectedly beating favourites Keflavík 3–1 in the Úrvalsdeild finals. In the championship clinching game, Davíð made five out of seven three point shots, scoring 15 points, as well as keeping Keflavík's star Deane Williams in check on defense.

On 2 October 2021, he scored 12 points in Þór's 113–100 win against Njarðvík in the Icelandic Super Cup.

=== National team career ===
In July 2021, Davíð Arnar was selected to the Icelandic national team for the first time.

== Coaching career ==
In June 2026, Davíð was hired as the head coach of Þór Þorlákshöfn women's team.

== Awards and honours ==
- Icelandic championship: 2021
- Icelandic Super Cup (3): (2016, 2017, 2021)
