= KR-b (men's basketball) =

- Leagues: 2. deild karla
- Arena: DHL-Höllin
- Capacity: 1,500
- Location: Reykjavík, Iceland
- Team colors: Black, White
- Head coach: Jóhannes Árnason
- Affiliation(s): KR
- Website: www.kr.is
Home	Away

The KR-b men's basketball team, commonly known as KR-b or KR Bumban, is the reserve team of KR men's basketball, based in Reykjavík, Iceland. It currently plays in the 2. deild karla and the Icelandic basketball cup. Despite the teams reserve status, it regularly features high profile players during the Icelandic basketball cup.

== Notable players ==
Note: Flags indicate national team eligibility at FIBA-sanctioned events. Players may hold other non-FIBA nationalities not displayed.

Criteria

To appear in this section a player must have either:

- Set a club record or won an individual award while at the club
- Played at least one official international match for their national team at any time
- Played at least one official NBA match at any time.

- (Iceland) Baldur Ólafsson
- (United States) Ben Jacobson
- (Iceland) Birgir Mikaelsson
- (Iceland) Brynjar Þór Björnsson
- (Iceland) Danero Thomas
- (Iceland) Fannar Ólafsson
- (Iceland) Finnur Atli Magnússon
- (Iceland) Helgi Már Magnússon
- (Iceland) Herbert Arnarson
- (Iceland) Hermann Hauksson
- (Iceland) Ingvaldur Magni Hafsteinsson
- (Iceland) Jón Arnór Stefánsson
- (Iceland) Páll Kolbeinsson
- (Iceland) Pálmi Freyr Sigurgeirsson
- (United States) Marcus Walker
- (Iceland) Martin Hermannsson
- (Iceland) Matthías Orri Sigurðarson
- (United States) Melvin Scott
- (Iceland) Óðinn Ásgeirsson
- (Iceland) Ólafur Jón Ormsson
- (Iceland) Skarphéðinn Freyr Ingason
- (Iceland) Sigurður Þorvaldsson
