= Birgir Mikaelsson =

Icelandic basketball player and coach

Personal information
- Born: 27 September 1965 (age 61) Akureyri, Iceland

Career information
- High school: Thomas Jefferson (Jefferson Hills, Pennsylvania)
- College: Tarkio College (1986–1987)
- Playing career: 1981–2017
- Coaching career: 1990–2004

Career history

Playing
- 1981–1982: KR
- 1984–1986: KR
- 1987–1990: KR
- 1990–1994: Skallagrímur
- 1994–1995: KR
- 1995–1996: Breiðablik
- 1996–1997: KR
- 1997–1999: Snæfell
- 1999–2000: Skallagrímur
- 2001: Skallagrímur
- 2001–2003: Þór Þorlákshöfn
- 2003–2004: Ármann/Þróttur
- 200?–2017: KR-b

Coaching
- 1990–1994: Skallagrímur (M)
- 1994–1995: ÍS (W)
- 1996–1997: Breiðablik (W)
- 1998–1999: Snæfell (M)
- 2001–2003: Þór Þorlákshöfn (M)
- 2003–2004: Ármann/Þróttur (M)
- 2010–2011: Valur (assistant)

Career highlights
- As player: Icelandic champion (1990); 2× 1. deild winner (1991, 1998); Úrvalsdeild Domestic All-First Team (1993); 1. deild Domestic Player of the Year (1998); 1. deild Domestic All-First Team (1998); As coach: 2× 1. deild winner (1991, 1998); 1. deild Coach of the Year (1998)

Career Úrvalsdeild karla playing statistics
- Points: 4,411 (14.0 ppg)
- Games: 316

Career coaching record
- Úrvalsdeild karla: 33–57 (.367)
- Úrvalsdeild kvenna: 9–33 (.214)
- 1. deild karla: 58–24 (.707)

Birgir Mikaelsson (born 27 September 1965) is an Icelandic former basketball player and a former member of Icelandic national team. In 1990, he won the national championships with KR. During his career, he played in four different decades.

== Early life ==
Birgir was born in Akureyri, Iceland, before moving with his family to the capital city of Reykjavík at a young age. There he started playing basketball along with football and handball.

== Playing career ==
=== Early career ===
Birgir debuted with KR in February 1981 at the age of 15, becoming one of the youngest players to play in the Úrvalsdeild karla. He appeared in 20 games the following season, averaging 4.0 points per game.

=== High school ===
In 1982, Birgir moved to the United States to attend Thomas Jefferson High School in Jefferson Hills, Pennsylvania at the beheast of his KR coach and former ABA player Stew Johnson. He played for the school's basketball team, The Jaguars, where he averaged around 13 points per game during his first season.

=== Return to Iceland ===
After two years in the States, Birgir moved back to Iceland an initially planned to play for his hometown team Þór Akureyri in the second-tier 1. deild karla. In September however, he signed back with KR to play in the Úrvalsdeild. During the 1985–86 season, he led the league in free throw percentage by making 90.1% of his free throws while also averaging a team high 20.8 points per game, good for third in the league.

In 1986, Birgir again moved to the United States, this time to attend Tarkio College. He returned to KR the following season. During the 1989, Birgir announced that he would sign with Þór Akureyri but later renegaded on his decision and continued to play for KR. In April 1990, he helped KR to its first national championship since 1979.

After retiring following the 1999–2000 season, where he led the league in free throw percentage, he returned to Skallagrímur in March 2001. He helped the team win two of its last three games, securing the 8th place and last seat in the playoffs. In the playoffs, Skallagrímur lost 2–1 to Njarðvík in the first round.

== Icelandic national team ==
Birgir played 66 games for the Icelandic national team from 1985 to 1993.

== Coaching career ==
Birgir's first coaching stint was with Skallagrímur with whom he became a player-coach in 1990. He guided the team to first-place finish in the 1. deild karla in 1991 and promotion to the Úrvalsdeild.

In 1997, Birgir was hired as a player-coach for Snæfell. He guided the team to a lossless season in the 1. deild and promotion to the Úrvalsdeild. He resigned from his coaching duties in January 1999 with the team in 8th place.

Birgir was a player-coach for Þór Þorlákshöfn from 2001 to 2003. In his last season, he guided the team to promotion to the Úrvalsdeild.

During the 2003–2004 season, he was a player-coach for Ármann/Þróttur in the 1. deild. He served as an assistant to Yngvi Gunnlaugsson with Valur for the 2010–2011 season in the 1. deild and helped the team to promotion to the Úrvalsdeild.

=== Coaching record ===
| Season | League | Team | Wins | Losses | % | Playoffs | Notes |
|---|---|---|---|---|---|---|---|
| 1990-91 | 1. deild karla | Skallagrímur | 8 | 4 | 67% | - | Promoted to Úrvalsdeild |
| 1991-92 | Úrvalsdeild karla | Skallagrímur | 6 | 20 | 23% | - | |
| 1992-93 | Úrvalsdeild karla | Skallagrímur | 14 | 12 | 54% | 1st round | |
| 1993-94 | Úrvalsdeild karla | Skallagrímur | 7 | 19 | 27% | - | |
| 1994-95 | Úrvalsdeild kvenna | ÍS | 8 | 16 | 33% | - | |
| 1996-97 | Úrvalsdeild kvenna | Breiðablik | 1 | 17 | 5% | - | |
| 1997-98 | 1. deild karla | Snæfell | 18 | 0 | 100% | Winners | Promoted to Úrvalsdeild |
| 1998-99 | Úrvalsdeild karla | Snæfell | 6 | 6 | 50% | Resigned in January 1999 | |
| 2001-02 | 1. deild karla | Þór Þorlákshöfn | 11 | 7 | 61% | DNQ | |
| 2002-03 | 1. deild karla | Þór Þorlákshöfn | 11 | 5 | 68% | Finals | Promoted to Úrvalsdeild |
| 2003-04 | 1. deild karla | Ármann/Þróttur | 10 | 8 | 56% | Semi-finals | |

== Titles, awards and accomplishments ==
=== Titles ===
- Icelandic champion: 1990
- 1. deild karla (2): 1991, 1998

=== Awards ===
- Úrvalsdeild Domestic All-First Team: 1993

=== Accomplishments ===
- Úrvalsdeild karla Free Throw Percentage leader (2): 1986, 2000
