= Jón Ólafur Jónsson (basketball) =

Icelandic basketball player

Personal information
- Born: 14 July 1981 (age 45) Reykjavík, Iceland
- Listed height: 1.99 m (6 ft 6 in)

Career information
- Playing career: 1997–2014; 2020–2020
- Position: Forward

Career history
- 1997–1998: Snæfell
- 1998–1999: ÍA
- 1999–2000: Snæfell
- 2000–2002: Stjarnan
- 2002–2004: Snæfell
- 2004–2005: KR
- 2005–2014: Snæfell
- 2020: Grundarfjörður

Career highlights
- 3x Úrvalsdeild Domestic All-First team (2011–2013); Icelandic champion (2010); 2x Icelandic Cup (2008, 2010); Icelandic Super Cup (2010); 2x Icelandic Company Cup (2007, 2010)

Career Úrvalsdeild karla statistics
- Points: 3,263 (11.9 ppg)
- Games: 274
Medals
Men's basketball
Representing Iceland
Games of the Small States of Europe
Bronze medal – third place	2013 Luxembourg	Team

Jón Ólafur Jónsson (born 14 July 1981), also known as Nonni Mæju, is an Icelandic basketball player and a former member of the Icelandic men's national basketball team. He was a key player on the Snæfell team that won the Icelandic championship, the Icelandic Basketball Cup, the Icelandic Supercup and the Icelandic Company Cup in 2010. He retired from top-level play after the 2013–14 season due to lingering injuries.

== Awards, titles and accomplishments ==
=== Individual awards ===
- Úrvalsdeild Domestic All-First team (3): 2011, 2012, 2013

=== Titles ===
- Icelandic champion: 2010
- Icelandic Basketball Cup (2): 2008, 2010
- Icelandic Supercup: 2010
- Icelandic Company Cup (2): 2007, 2010
- Icelandic D1: 1998

=== Accomplishments ===
- Icelandic All-Star Game Three-Point Shootout champion: 2012
