= Fannar Ólafsson =

Icelandic basketball player (born 1978)

Personal information
- Born: 20 November 1978 (age 47) Iceland
- Listed height: 203 cm (6 ft 8 in)

Career information
- College: South Carolina (2000–2001); Indiana (PA) (2001–2004)
- Playing career: 1996–2018
- Position: Center

Career history
- 1996–1997: Laugdælir
- 1997–2000: Keflavík
- 2001: Keflavík
- 2003–2004: Keflavík
- 2004–2005: Doukas B.C.
- 2005: Ratiopharm Ulm
- 2005–2011: KR
- 2011–2018: KR-b

Career highlights
- 2x Úrvalsdeild Domestic All-First Team (2000, 2006); 5x Icelandic league champion (1999, 2004, 2007, 2009, 2011); 2x Icelandic Basketball Cup (2004, 2011); 2x Icelandic Supercup (1997, 2007); 3x Icelandic Company Cup (1997, 1998, 2008)

Fannar Ólafsson (born 20 November 1978) is an Icelandic basketball analyst on Stöð 2 Sport's Domino's Körfuboltakvöld (English: Domino's Basketball Night) and a former basketball player. He went five times to the Úrvalsdeild finals, as a member of Keflavík and KR, and won the national championships each time. He won the Icelandic Basketball Cup in 2004 and 2011.

During the 2004–2005 season, Fannar played with Doukas B.C. and Ratiopharm Ulm. He has the second best all-time field goal percentage in Ratiopharm Ulm's history.

== Icelandic national team ==
Between 1998 and 2009, Fannar played 76 games for the Icelandic national basketball team.

== Personal life ==
His father, Ólafur Einarsson, was a member of the Icelandic national handball team. His sister, Björt Ólafsdóttir, is a former MP for Bright Future and served as the Minister for the Environment and Natural Resources in 2017. Fannar's brother, Eldur Ólafsson, played 6 seasons in the Úrvalsdeild.

On 7 February 2004, while celebrating Keflavík's victory in the Icelandic Basketball Cup in Reykjanesbær, Fannar was assaulted by a 22-year-old man from Njarðvík. The man hit him in the head with a glass, resulting in Fannar receiving multiple deep cuts in his face and losing consciousness from blood loss. He lost 2.5 litres (0.66 US gal) of blood and required a three-hour operation to close the eleven deep cuts he suffered.
