= Sigurður Þorvaldsson =

Icelandic basketball player (born 1980)

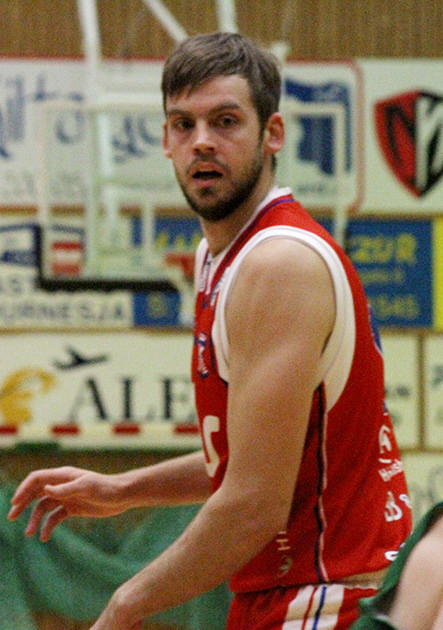
- Sigurður in a game between Snæfell and Njarðvík in 2014

Personal information
- Born: 25 November 1980 (age 45)

Career information
- Playing career: 2000–2010; 2012–2020
- Position: Forward
- Number: 11, 23
- Coaching career: 2008–2009

Career history

Playing
- 2000–2003: ÍR
- 2003–2005: Snæfell
- 2005–2006: Wool!Aris Leeuwarden
- 2006–2010: Snæfell
- 2012–2016: Snæfell
- 2016–2020: KR
- 2019: → KR-b

Coaching
- 2008–2009: Snæfell

Career highlights
- Úrvalsdeild Domestic Player of the Year (2005); 4x Úrvalsdeild Domestic All-First Team (2005, 2007, 2009, 2010); 4x Icelandic champion (2010, 2017–2019); 4× Icelandic Basketball Cup (2001, 2008, 2010, 2017)
Medals
Men's basketball
Representing Iceland
Games of the Small States of Europe
Silver medal – second place	2015 Reykjavík	National Team

Sigurður Ágúst Þorvaldsson (born 25 November 1980) is an Icelandic basketball player and a former member of the Icelandic national team. During his career, he won the Icelandic championship and the Icelandic Cup four times each. He was a four-time Úrvalsdeild Domestic All-First Team member and in 2005 he was named the Úrvalsdeild Domestic Player of the Year.

In 2010, Sigurður was found guilty of rape and sentenced to two years in prison.

== Basketball career ==
After spending his first five seasons with ÍR and Snæfell, Sigurður signed with Woon!Aris Leeuwarden in Netherlands in 2005.

He later returned to Snæfell and in 2010, he was member of the Snæfell team that won all four major men's competitions in Icelandic basketball that year: the national championship, the Icelandic Basketball Cup, the Icelandic Company Cup and the Icelandic Supercup.

In 2017, Sigurður signed with KR. On April 28, 2018, he won his third Icelandic championship after KR defeated Tindastóll in the Úrvalsdeild finals.

On 4 May 2019 he won his 4th national championship after KR beat ÍR in the Úrvalsdeild finals 3–2.

=== Awards and achievements ===
==== Individual awards ====
- Úrvalsdeild Domestic Player of the Year (2005)
- 4x Úrvalsdeild Domestic All-First Team (2005, 2007, 2009, 2010)

==== Club honours ====
- 4x Icelandic champion (2010, 2017, 2018, 2019)
- 4× Icelandic Basketball Cup (2001, 2008, 2010, 2017)
- 2x Icelandic Company Cup (2004, 2007)

=== National team career ===
Sigurður has played 56 games for the Icelandic national basketball team.

== Legal history ==
In 2010, Sigurður was found guilty of raping a 17-year-old girl in November 2009 and sentenced to two years in prison. The Supreme Court of Iceland confirmed the sentence in 2011 after an appeal. He was released from prison in 2012.
