= Ríkharður Hrafnkelsson =

Icelandic basketball player

Personal information
- Born: 30 April 1957 (age 69) Stykkishólmur, Iceland

Career information
- Playing career: 1973–1991

Career history

Playing
- 1973: Snæfell
- 1974–1983: Valur
- 1983–1991: Snæfell

Coaching
- 1991–1994: Snæfell (assistant)

Career highlights
- 2× Icelandic champion (1980, 1983); 3× Icelandic Cup winner (1980, 1981, 1983); 1. deild karla winner (1990)

Ríkharður Hrafnkelsson (born 30 April 1957) is an Icelandic former basketball player and a former member of Icelandic national team. He won two national championships and three Icelandic Cups with Valur in the 1980s.

== Early life ==
Ríkharður grew up in Stykkishólmur, Iceland. He played his first games with Snæfell at the age of 16 before moving to Reykjavík and joining Valur.

== Icelandic national team ==
Ríkharður played 69 games for the Icelandic national team from 1976 to 1983.

== Awards and accomplishments ==
=== Titles ===
- Icelandic champion: 1980, 1983
- Icelandic Cup (3): 1979, 1981, 1986
- 1. deild karla (1): 1990

== Golf ==
Ríkharður was the chairman of the Golfklúbburinn Mostri in Stykkishólmur for 25 years.
