= Haukur Pálsson =

Icelandic basketball player

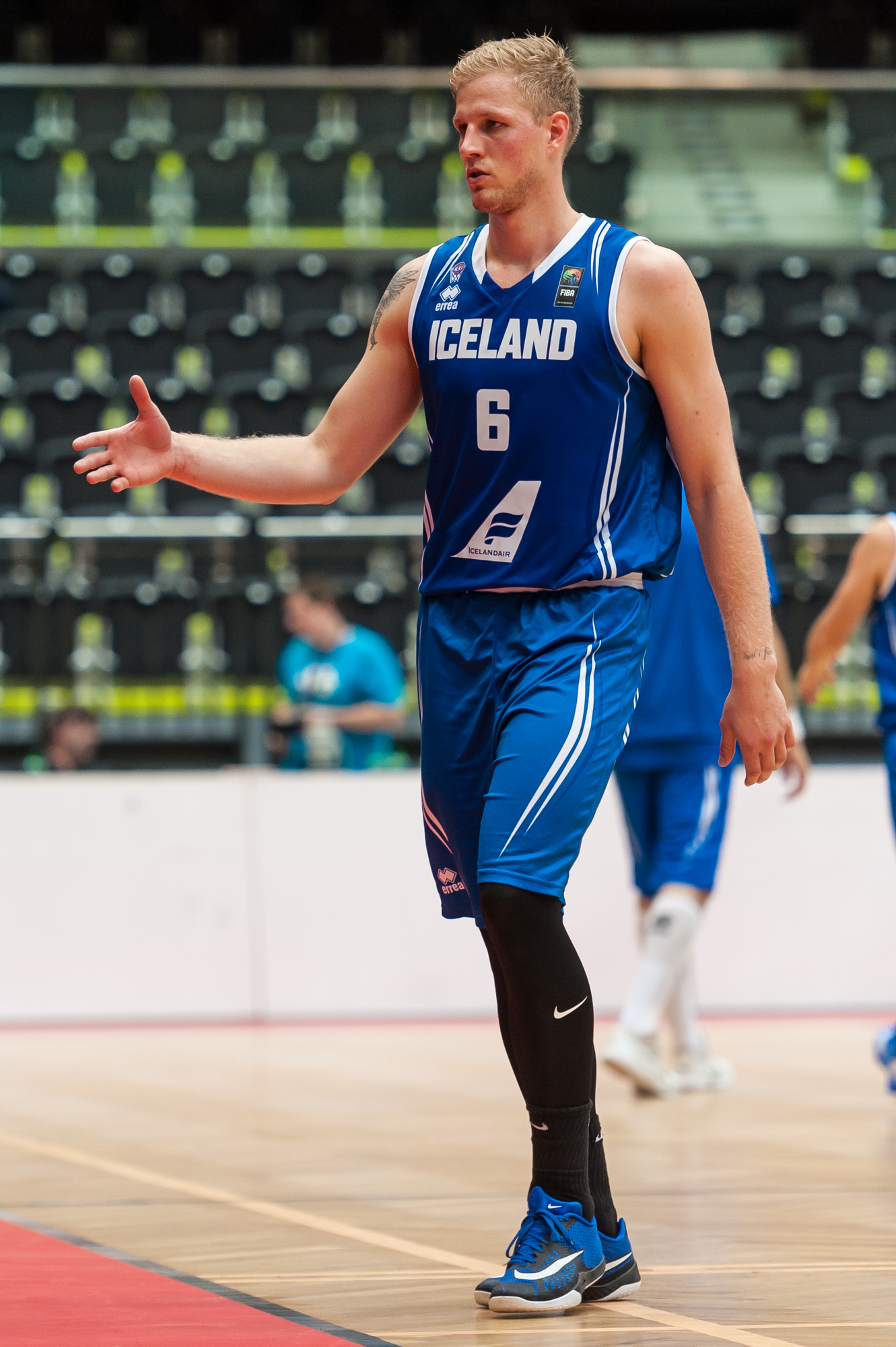
- Pálsson with Iceland in 2016

Álftanes
- Position: Power forward / small forward
- League: Úrvalsdeild karla

Personal information
- Born: 18 May 1992 (age 34) Reykjavík, Iceland
- Listed height: 1.98 m (6 ft 6 in)

Career information
- High school: Montverde Academy (Montverde, Florida)
- College: Maryland (2010–2011)
- Playing career: 2007–present

Career history
- 2007–2009: Fjölnir
- 2011–2013: Manresa
- 2013–2014: Breogán
- 2014–2015: LF Luleå
- 2015: Baskonia
- 2015: Manresa
- 2015–2016: Njarðvík
- 2016–2017: Rouen Métropole
- 2017–2018: Cholet
- 2018–2019: Nanterre 92
- 2019–2020: Unics Kazan
- 2020–2021: Andorra
- 2021–2023: Njarðvík
- 2023–present: Álftanes

Career highlights
- Úrvalsdeild Domestic Player of the Year (2016); 2x Úrvalsdeild Domestic All-First Team (2016, 2025); 1. deild karla Domestic All-First Team (2009); Icelandic Cup (2021)

Haukur Helgi Briem Pálsson (born 18 May 1992) is an Icelandic basketball player for Úrvalsdeild karla club Álftanes and the Icelandic national team. With Iceland, he participated at the EuroBasket in 2015 and 2017.

== High school ==
Haukur played one year of high school basketball in the United States at Montverde Academy under Kevin Sutton.

== Club career ==
Haukur came up through the junior ranks of Fjölnir and was first brought up to the senior team during the 2006-2007 Úrvalsdeild karla season when he was an unused substitute in seven games. During the 2007–2008 season he appeared in nine games in the Úrvalsdeild karla for Fjölnir, averaging 1.0 points. In December 2008, he was invited by Stella Azzura to play with its junior team in the Junior EuroLeague during the days of 27–29 December. Following the tournament, he returned to Fjölnir. After finishing the season in the second tier 1. deild karla, where he was named to the Domestic All-First team, he left the club to join Montverde Academy in the United States and in 2010 he joined the University of Maryland.

In October 2015, Haukur signed with Icelandic powerhouse Njarðvík. The team finished seventh in the Úrvalsdeild karla. In the playoffs they knocked out second seed Stjarnan in the first round before bowing out to the eventual champions KR in the semi-finals. For the season he averaged 18.4 points, 7.3 rebounds and 4.1 assists, and was selected to the Úrvalsdeild Domestic All-First Team and as the Úrvalsdeild Domestic Player of the Year.

He spent the 2016–2017 season with Rouen Métropole Basket in the LNB Pro B where he averaged 12.3 points, 4.7 rebounds and 4 assists per game. In June 2017 Haukur signed with the LNB Pro A club Cholet Basket.

On 18 July 2018 Haukur switched teams in the LNB Pro A and signed with Nanterre 92. On 5 February 2019, he helped Nanterre to the Round of 16 in the 2018–19 Basketball Champions League after scoring 12 points in a 74–62 victory against Hapoel Holon. On 12 March 2019, he scored 11 points in Nanterre's 62–60 victory against Beşiktaş in the Round of 16 in the Champions League.

During the summer of 2019, Haukur was offered to play with New Orleans Pelicans in the 2019 NBA Summer League but turned it down due to the birth of his first child. In July 2019, he signed with Unics Kazan.

On 8 July 2020 Haukur signed with Andorra of the Liga ACB. In November 2020, he was diagnosed with COVID-19 along with several of Andorra's staff and players. In April 2021, he was ruled out for the rest of the season due to an ankle injury that required a surgery. In 19 games in the Liga ACB, he averaged 8.0 points and 2.5 rebounds per game while shooting 37.7% from the three point line. He also appeared in 9 games in the EuroCup where he averaged 10.7 points and 3.6 rebounds and shot 40.0% from the three point line.

On 1 June 2021, Haukur returned to the Úrvalsdeild karla and signed a 3-year contract with Njarðvík. He spent most of the first half of the season recovering from an ankle surgery but returned to the court on 3 December 2021 in a victory against Vestri.

On 4 May 2023, Haukur announced he was leaving Njarðvík. On 24 May, he signed with newly promoted Álftanes.

== National team career ==
Haukur played his first game with the Icelandic national team in 2011. He participated with the team at EuroBasket 2015 and EuroBasket 2017.
