= Ragnar Nathanaelsson =

Icelandic basketball player (born 1991)

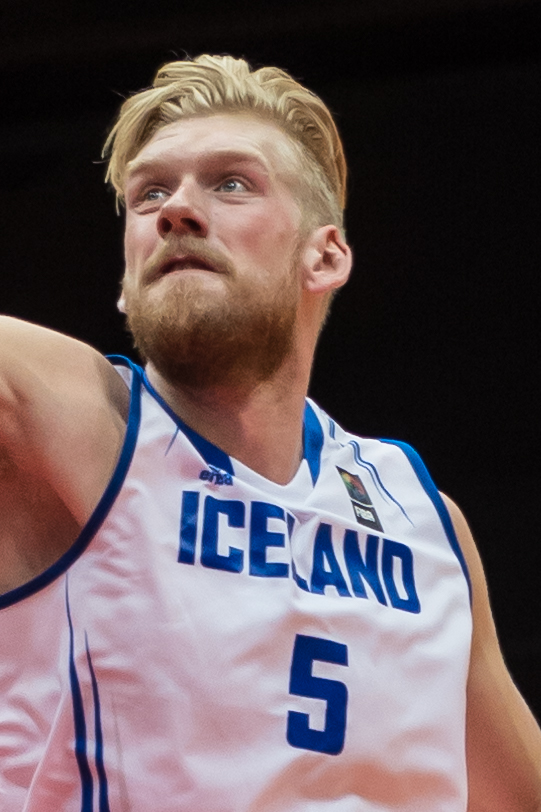

Álftanes
- Position: Center
- League: Úrvalsdeild karla

Personal information
- Born: 27 August 1991 (age 35) Selfoss, Iceland
- Listed height: 2.18 m (7 ft 2 in)

Career information
- Playing career: 2008–present

Career history
- 2008–2013: Hamar
- 2013–2014: Þór Þorlákshöfn
- 2014–2015: Sundsvall Dragons
- 2015–2016: Þór Þorlákshöfn
- 2016–2017: Cáceres Ciudad del Baloncesto
- 2017: Arcos Albacete Basket
- 2017–2018: Njarðvík
- 2018–2020: Valur
- 2020–2021: Haukar
- 2021–2022: Stjarnan
- 2022–2025: Hamar
- 2025–present: Álftanes

Career highlights
- 2× Úrvalsdeild Domestic All-First team (2014, 2016); 1. deild Domestic All-First team (2023); 1. deild Defense Player of the Year (2023); Icelandic Cup (2022); 1. deild karla (2009); Úrvalsdeild karla blocks leader (2011); 1. deild karla rebounding leader (2023); 2× 1. deild karla blocks leader (2013, 2023)

Ragnar Ágúst Nathanaelsson (born 27 August 1991) is an Icelandic basketball player who plays for Álftanes. He participated at EuroBasket 2015 as a member of the Icelandic national team. He is a two time Úrvalsdeild Domestic All-First team selection and won the Icelandic Basketball Cup in 2022. Ragnar is the tallest living man in Iceland.

== Playing career ==
=== Club career ===
Ragnar started his senior career with Hamar at the age of fifteen and at the age of sixteen he was already 216 cm tall. At the age of nineteen, Ragnar was 218 cm tall and had broken into Hamar's starting lineup.

He played for Þór Þorlákshöfn during the 2013–2014 season where he was named to the Úrvalsdeild Domestic All-First team. He joined Sundsvall Dragons prior the 2014–15 Basketligan season before returning to Þór Þorlákshöfn in 2015. He helped Þór to the Icelandic Basketball Cup finals where it lost to KR. After the 2015–2016 season he was once again named to the Úrvalsdeild Domestic All-First team.

In 2016, Ragnar had a tryout with the Dallas Mavericks.

On 25 August 2016 Ragnar signed with Cáceres Ciudad del Baloncesto of the LEB Oro. On 13 January 2017 he left Cáceres and joined Arcos Albacete Basket of the Spanish LEB Plata.

On 6 July 2017 Ragnar signed with Njarðvík. He averaged 7.5 points, 7.7 rebounds and 1.5 blocks per game during the regular season, helping Njarðvík to a 5th-place finish. He upped his averages to 12.0 points and 10.3 rebounds during the playoffs but was unable to prevent Njarðvík from being swept during its first round series against KR. He left Njarðvík at the end of the season.

On 28 April 2018 Ragnar signed with Valur. In 22 games for Valur, Ragnar averaged 10.3 points, 9.4 rebounds and 1.2 blocks per game while shooting 57.6% from the field. During his second season with the team, he averaged 6.5 points and 5.0 rebounds. In May 2020, he was released by the club following the hiring of Finnur Freyr Stefánsson as head coach.

On 1 June 2020, Ragnar signed with Haukar. Relegated to a largely reserve role, he averaged 1.7 points and 3.5 rebounds per game

In August 2021, Ragnar signed with Stjarnan. He appeared in 16 games during the regular season, averaging 2.2 points and 2.7 rebounds per game. His best game of the season came in a win against Tindastóll on 18 November 2021, the same day his selection to the national team was criticized due to his lack of playing time with Stjarnan. In the game, he received increase in minutes due to an injury to Hlynur Bæringsson, and delivered 13 points and 8 rebounds along with a big defensive presence in the lane that was credited as a key part of the win. On 19 March 2022, he won his first Icelandic Basketball Cup when Stjarnan defeated reigning national champions Þór Þorlákshöfn in the 2022 Cup Finals.

In June 2022, Ragnar returned to his hometown club of Hamar. On 31 October 2022, he had 21 points and 19 rebounds in a loss against KR in the Icelandic Cup. On 27 January, he scored his first career three pointer in a win against Ármann. During the regular season he averaged 14.8 points and led the league with 15.8 rebounds and 3.4 blocks per game. After helping Hamar gain promotion to the top-tier Úrvalsdeild karla, he was named the 1. deild Defense Player of the Year and to the Domestic All-First team.

=== Icelandic national team ===
Ragnar played 21 games with Iceland's junior national teams from 2010 to 2013.

His first game with the senior national team was in 2013 and he was a member of Iceland's team in Eurobasket 2015. Ragnar was a member Iceland's team in the Games of the Small States of Europe in 2013 and 2015.
