= Páll Axel Vilbergsson =

Icelandic basketball player (born 1978)

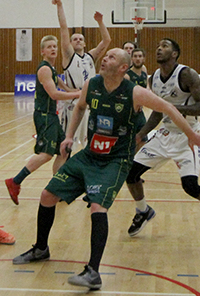
- Páll Axel in 2015

Personal information
- Born: 4 January 1978 (age 48)
- Listed height: 197 cm (6 ft 6 in)
- Listed weight: 95 kg (209 lb)

Career information
- College: Campbellsville (1997)
- Playing career: 1994–2019

Career history

Playing
- 1994–1997: Grindavík
- 1998: Skallagrímur
- 1998–1999: Grindavík
- 1999–2000: Fleron
- 2000–2012: Grindavík
- 2012–2015: Skallagrímur
- 2015–2016: Grindavík
- 2017–2019: Njarðvík-b

Coaching
- 2000: Grindavík (Women's)
- 2017: Grindavík (Women's)

Career highlights
- Úrvalsdeild Domestic Player of the Year (2004); 6x Úrvalsdeild Domestic All-First Team (2003, 2004, 2006–2008, 2010); 2x Icelandic league champion (1996, 2012); 2x Icelandic Basketball Cup (1995, 2006); 3x Icelandic Super Cup (1996, 1998, 2011)

Career Úrvalsdeild karla statistics
- Points: 6,949 (17.1 ppg)
- Rebounds: 2,471 (6.1 rpg)
- Games: 407

Páll Axel Vilbergsson (born 4 January 1978) is an Icelandic former basketball player who played for 22 seasons in the Úrvalsdeild karla and was a two time national champion. He was also a member of the Icelandic national team from 1996 to 2009. In 2004 he was selected as the Úrvalsdeild Domestic Player of the Year.

He was one of the most prolific three point shooters the Úrvalsdeild karla history and was its first player to make 1000 three points shots. In 2010 he tied the Úrvalsdeild record for most points scored by an Icelandic player in a single game when he scored 54 points against Tindastóll. In 2011 he made a controversial three pointer at the buzzer that won the Icelandic Super Cup for Grindavík.

Páll Axel last played for Division II club Njarðvík-b.

== Icelandic national team ==
From 1996 to 2009, Páll Axel played 92 games for the Icelandic national basketball team.

== Awards and accomplishments ==
=== Club honours ===
- Icelandic championship (2): 1996, 2012
- Icelandic Basketball Cup (2): 1995, 2006
- Icelandic Super Cup (3) : 1996, 1998, 2011
- Icelandic Company Cup (3) : 2000, 2009, 2011

=== Individual awards ===
- Úrvalsdeild Domestic Player of the Year (1) : 2004
- Úrvalsdeild Domestic All-First Team (6) : 2003, 2004, 2006–2008, 2010

== Personal life ==
Páll Axel is the brother of Ármann Vilbergsson, who played several seasons in Úrvalsdeild karla.
