= Jón Arnór Stefánsson =

Icelandic basketball player

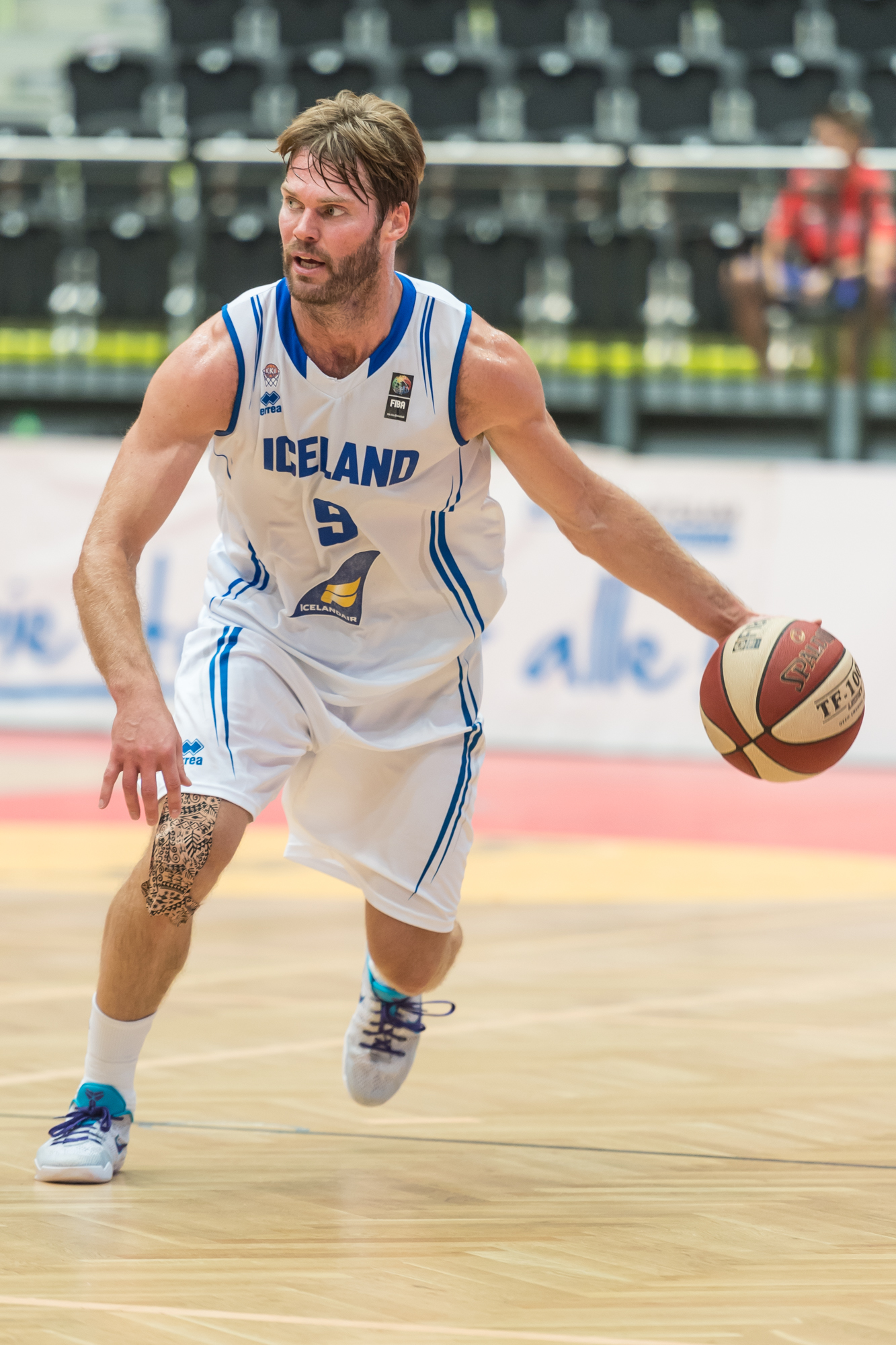
- Stefánsson with the Iceland national basketball team in September 2015

KR-b
- Position: Shooting guard
- League: 2. deild karla

Personal information
- Born: 21 September 1982 (age 44) Skövde, Sweden
- Listed height: 6 ft 5 in (1.96 m)
- Listed weight: 203 lb (92 kg)

Career information
- High school: Artesia (Lakewood, California)
- NBA draft: 2003: undrafted
- Playing career: 2000–present

Career history
- 2000–2002: KR
- 2002–2003: TBB Trier
- 2003–2004: Dallas Mavericks
- 2004–2005: Dynamo Saint Petersburg
- 2005–2006: Carpisa Napoli
- 2006–2007: Pamesa Valencia
- 2007–2008: Lottomatica Roma
- 2008–2009: KR
- 2009: Benetton Treviso
- 2009–2011: CB Granada
- 2011–2014: CAI Zaragoza
- 2014–2015: Unicaja
- 2015–2016: Valencia Basket
- 2016–2020: KR
- 2020–2021: Valur
- 2022–present: KR-b

Career highlights
- Icelandic Sportsperson of the Year (2014); 12x Icelandic Basketball Player of the Year; 3x Úrvalsdeild Domestic Player of the Year (2002, 2009, 2017); 4x Úrvalsdeild Domestic All-First Team (2001, 2002, 2009, 2017); 2x Úrvalsdeild Men's Playoffs MVP (2009, 2017); FIBA EuroCup All-Star Day (2005); FIBA Europe League (2005); 5x Icelandic championship (2000, 2009, 2017–2019); Icelandic Cup (2017); Italian Basketball Cup (2006)

Jón Arnór Stefánsson (born 21 September 1982) is an Icelandic basketball player and a former member of the Icelandic national team. One of Iceland's most successful athletes of the early 21st century, he was the Icelandic Sportsperson of the Year in 2014 and a 12-time Icelandic Male Basketball Player of the Year. A three-time Úrvalsdeild Domestic Player of the Year, he won the Icelandic championship five times and the FIBA Europe League once. He spent most of his career in Spain, Italy and Iceland, winning the Italian Basketball Cup in 2006 and the Icelandic Cup in 2017.

== High school career ==
Jón Arnór attended Artesia High School in Lakewood, California from 1999 to 2000. His stay was cut short when allegations rose that he and teammate Jack Michael Martínez had been illegally recruited by coach Wayne Merino. In the end Artesia's basketball program was stripped of two championships and Merino, Artesia's coach for thirteen seasons, was fired.

== Professional career ==
Following his high school career, Jón returned to KR in time for the 2000 Úrvalsdeild karla playoffs and helped the club win the national championship. He played with KR until 2002, when he joined TBB Trier.

After going undrafted in the 2003 NBA draft, he signed with the Dallas Mavericks for the 2003–2004 season, but he spent the whole season on the injury list and never played a regular season or playoff game with them.

In 2005, he won the FIBA EuroCup title with BC Dynamo Saint Petersburg.

== Return to Iceland ==
In 2016, Jón Arnór returned to Iceland and joined KR. On 30 April 2017, he won the Icelandic championship for the third time with KR and was named the 2017 playoffs MVP. On 28 April 2018 Jón Arnór won his fourth Icelandic championship after KR defeated Tindastóll in the Úrvalsdeild finals. In November 2018, Jón Arnór announced that he would retire after the 2018-2019 season.

On 4 May 2019 Jón Arnór won his 5th national championship after KR beat ÍR in the Úrvalsdeild finals 3–2.

In August 2020, Jón Arnór signed with KR rivals Valur.

He announced his retirement from professional basketball following Valur's 2–3 loss against KR in the first round of the Úrvalsdeild playoffs.

In January 2022, Jón Arnór returned to the floor with KR-b in the Icelandic third-tier 2. deild karla.

== National team career ==
Jón Arnór played 100 games for the Icelandic men's national basketball team from 2000 to 2019, appearing in EuroBasket 2015 and EuroBasket 2017. He retired after Iceland's 91–67 victory against Portugal on 21 February 2019, where he led all scorers with 17 points.

== Career statistics ==
Legend
GP	Games played	GS	Games started	MPG	Minutes per game
FG%	Field-goal percentage	3P%	3-point field-goal percentage	FT%	Free-throw percentage
RPG	Rebounds per game	APG	Assists per game	SPG	Steals per game
BPG	Blocks per game	PPG	Points per game	PIR	Performance index rating
**Bold**	Career high

=== Euroleague ===
Year	Team	GP	GS	MPG	FG%	3P%	FT%	RPG	APG	SPG	BPG	PPG	PIR
2006–07	Lottomatica	6	0	18.2	.359	.133	**.800**	1.8	.8	1.0	.0	6.3	2.8
2007–08	Lottomatica	15	**5**	**25.5**	.386	**.311**	.796	**2.3**	**1.3**	**1.1**	.0	**10.0**	**7.7**
2014–15	Unicaja	**20**	3	13.1	**.396**	.286	.600	.6	1.2	.2	.0	5.1	1.6
Career		41	8	18.4	.386	.280	.750	1.4	1.2	.6	.0	7.1	4.0

== Awards and accomplishments ==
=== Club honours ===
- FIBA Europe League:2004–05
- Italian Basketball Cup: 2006
- Icelandic championship: 2000, 2009, 2017, 2018, 2019
- Icelandic Basketball Cup: 2017
- Icelandic Company Cup: 2008

=== Individual awards ===
- **Icelandic Sportsperson of the Year** : 2014
- **Icelandic Basketball Player of the Year** : 2002–2005, 2007–2010, 2012–2015
- **Úrvalsdeild Domestic Player of the Year** : 2002, 2009, 2017
- **Úrvalsdeild Domestic All-First Team** : 2001, 2002, 2009, 2017
- **Úrvalsdeild Men's Playoffs MVP (2)** : 2009, 2017
- Icelandic Cup MVP: 2017
- **FIBA EuroCup All-Star Day** : (2005)

== Personal life ==
Jón Arnór was born in Skövde, Sweden, to Icelandic parents. He is the brother of handballer and Olympic silver medalist Ólafur Stefánsson and former footballer Eggert Stefánsson who played with Fram in Úrvalsdeild karla.
