= Helgi Már Magnússon =

Icelandic basketball player

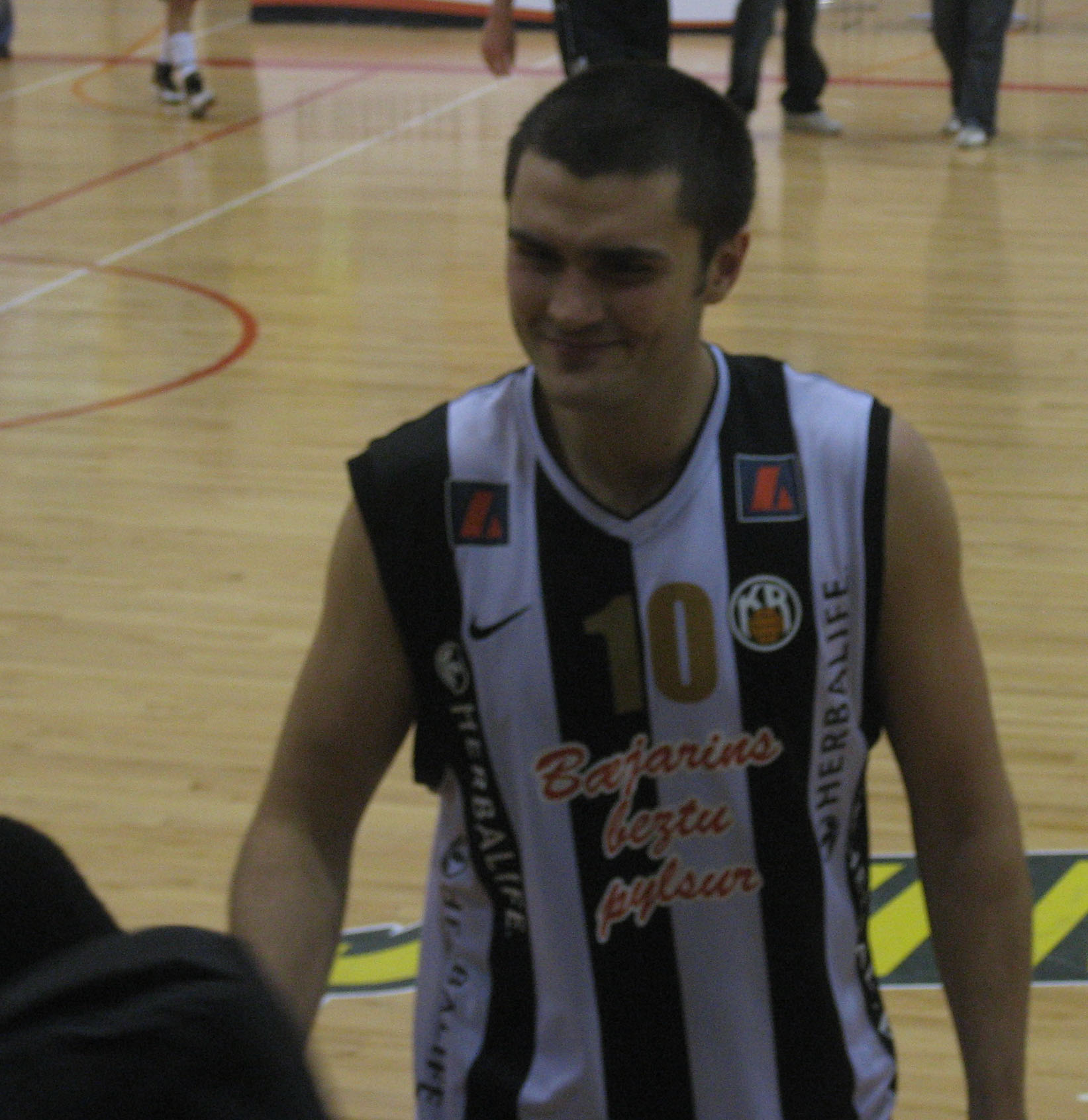

Personal information
- Born: August 27, 1982 (age 44) Reykjavík, Iceland
- Listed height: 197 cm (6 ft 6 in)

Career information
- High school: Westminster Christian School (Palmetto Bay, Florida)
- College: Catawba (2002–2006)
- Playing career: 1998–2021
- Position: Small forward
- Coaching career: 2012–2013; 2021–present

Career history

Playing
- 1998–2000: KR
- 2001–2002: KR
- 2006–2007: BC Boncourt
- 2007–2009: KR
- 2009–2010: Solna Vikings
- 2010–2011: Uppsala Basket
- 2011–2012: 08 Stockholm
- 2012–2016: KR
- 2017: KR-b
- 2018–2021: KR

Coaching
- 2012–2013: KR
- 2021–2023: KR
- 2025–2026: Grindavík (assistant)

Career highlights
- As player: 3× Úrvalsdeild Domestic All-First Team (2014–2016); 7× Icelandic league champion (2000, 2009, 2014–2016, 2018, 2019); Icelandic Basketball Cup (2016); Icelandic Cup MVP (2016); 2× Icelandic Company Cup (2008, 2014); 2× First-team All-SAC (2005, 2006); SAC tournament MVP (2004); As assistant coach: Icelandic league champion (2026)
Medals
Men's basketball
Representing Iceland
Games of the Small States of Europe
Bronze medal – third place	2015 Reykjavík	Team

Helgi Már Magnússon (born August 27, 1982) is an Icelandic basketball coach and former player. As a player, he has won seven national championships in Iceland during his career.

== Club career ==
In February 2016, Helgi won his first Icelandic Basketball Cup after having lost in his previous four cup finals. Helgi announced is retirement from top level play following the 2015-2016 Úrvalsdeild season. but returned to the team in March 2018. A month later, Helgi won his sixth Icelandic championship after KR defeated Tindastóll in the Úrvalsdeild finals.

On 4 May 2019 he won his 7th national championship after KR beat ÍR in the Úrvalsdeild finals 3–2.

On 5 January 2020, he appeared in an Úrvalsdeild game for the fourth different decade.

== National team career ==
Helgi played 95 games for the Icelandic national basketball team and participated at the EuroBasket 2015.

== Coaching career ==
Helgi was a player coach for KR during the 2012–13 season. In August 2021, he was hired as the head coach of KR, replacing Darri Freyr Atlason who resigned following the 2020–21 season. Following KR's relegation from the Úrvalsdeild in 2023, he stepped down as coach.

In July 2025, he was hired as an assistant coach for Grindavík.

== Personal life ==
Helgi's brother, Finnur Atli Magnússon, is a former member of the Icelandic national basketball team. On 18 May 2026, he won his eight national championship after Grindavík defeated Tindastóll in the Úrvalsdeild finals, 3–1.
