= Óðinn Ásgeirsson =

Icelandic basketball player

Personal information
- Born: 14 February 1979 (age 47)
- Listed height: 200 cm (6 ft 7 in)

Career history
- 1996–1997: Þór Akureyri
- 1997–2002: Þór Akureyri
- 2002–2003: KR
- 2003–2004: Ulriken Eagles
- 2004–2011: Þór Akureyri
- 2013: Þór Akureyri
- 2019: Þór Akureyri

Career highlights
- 2× Úrvalsdeild Domestic All-First Team (2001, 2002); 2× 1. deild karla winner (2005, 2007); 1. deild Domestic All-First team (2010)

Óðinn Ásgeirsson (born 4 February 1979) is an Icelandic former basketball player. He played several seasons in the Icelandic top-tier Úrvalsdeild karla and was twice named to the Úrvalsdeild Domestic All-First Team during his career.

== Playing career ==
Óðinn started training basketball at the age of 14 and played his first senior teams games in 1996 with Þór Akureyri in the Úrvalsdeild karla. The following year he went as a transfer student to Jamaica before returning in 1998 to play for Þór.

On 15 October 2000, Óðinn scored a game winning three pointer at the buzzer to beat KR 79–78. For the season, he averaged 18.4 points and 9.1 rebounds and was named to the Úrvalsdeild Domestic All-First Team for the first time.

During the 2001–2002 season, Óðinn averaged 17.0 points and 10.3 rebounds per game and was named to the Domestic All-First Team for the second year in a row. After Þór withdrew from the Úrvalsdeild prior to the start of the 2002–2003 season due to financial difficulties, Óðinn signed with KR.

In August 2003, Óðinn signed with Norwegian club Ulriken Eagles. He returned to Iceland following the season and rejoined Þór.

After averaging 21.3 points and 6.8 rebounds in Þór's first four game of the 2005–2006 season, Óðinn tore his achillies tendon and missed the rest of the season. Without him, Þór was relegated to the 1. deild karla. Óðinn returned from the injury the following season, and helped Þór going 14–0 in the 1. deild and gaining promotion back to the Úrvalsdeild.

During the 2007–2008 season, he averaged 15.1 points and 7.0 rebounds, helping Þór reach the Úrvalsdeild playoffs where they lost to eventual champions Keflavík in the first round. The following season, he averaged 10.1 points and 7.7 rebounds per game but was unable to prevent Þór from relegating to the 1. deild.

Following the 2009–2010 season, where he averaged 17.4 points and 10.6 rebounds, he was selected to the 1. deild Domestic All-First team.

After initially retiring in 2011, he returned briefly in 2013 and 2019 to play for Þór.

== National team career ==
Óðinn played for the Iceland national B-team during the 2000 Nordic Basketball Tournament.
