= Þór Þorlákshöfn (basketball) =

- Leagues: (M) Úrvalsdeild karla (W) 1. deild kvenna
- Founded: 1991
- History: Þór Þorlákshöfn; 1991–present
- Arena: Iceland Glacial Palace
- Location: Þorlákshöfn, Iceland
- Team colors: Green, White, blue
- Championships: 1 (2021)
- Website: umfthor.is
Home	Away

Körfuknattleiksdeild Þórs Þorlákshafnar is an Icelandic basketball club, commonly known as Þór Þorlákshöfn. It is a subdivision of Þór Þorlákshöfn multi sports club, based in the town of Þorlákshöfn in Iceland. Its men's team currently plays in Úrvalsdeild karla.

== Men's basketball ==
=== History ===
On 25 June 2021, Þór won its first ever Icelandic championship by beating Keflavík in the Úrvalsdeild finals. Adomas Drungilas was named the Úrvalsdeild Playoffs MVP. In December 2022, Stöð 2 premiered a documentary, titled Hamingjan er hér, about the clubs history.

=== Honors ===
- Icelandic Championship (1):

2021

- Super Cup (3):

2016, 2017, 2021

- Division I (1):

2011

=== Notable players ===
Note: Flags indicate national team eligibility at FIBA-sanctioned events. Players may hold other non-FIBA nationalities not displayed.

Criteria

To appear in this section a player must have either:

- Set a club record or won an individual award while at the club
- Played at least one official international match for their national team at any time
- Played at least one official NBA match at any time.

- (Lithuania) Adomas Drungilas
- (Iceland) Baldur Þór Ragnarsson
- (Iceland) Birgir Mikaelsson
- (Denmark) Daniel Mortensen
- (Iceland) Darri Hilmarsson
- (Iceland) Davíð Arnar Ágústsson
- (Iceland) Emil Karel Einarsson
- (Iceland) Grétar Ingi Erlendsson
- (Iceland) Guðmundur Jónsson
- (Iceland) Halldór Garðar Hermannsson
- (Iceland) Maciej Baginski
- (Iceland) Ragnar Nathanaelsson
- (Iceland) Styrmir Snær Þrastarson
- (Iceland) Tómas Valur Þrastarson
- (United States) Vincent Shahid
- (Greece) Costis Gontikas

=== Notable coaches ===
- (Iceland) Birgir Mikaelsson 2001–2003
- (Iceland) Benedikt Guðmundsson 2010–2015
- (Iceland) Einar Árni Jóhannsson 2015–2018
- (Iceland) Baldur Þór Ragnarsson 2018–2019
- (Iceland) Friðrik Ingi Rúnarsson 2019–2020
- (Iceland) Lárus Jónsson 2020–2026
- (Croatia) Ilija Omrčen 2026–present

== Recent seasons ==
Season	Tier	League	Pos.	W–L	Playoffs	Icelandic Cup
2010–11	2	1. deild karla	1st	17–1	N/A	2nd round
2011–12	1	Úrvalsdeild karla	3rd	15–7	Runner-up	2nd round
2012–13	1	Úrvalsdeild karla	2nd	16–6	1st round	2nd round
2013–14	1	Úrvalsdeild karla	6th	11-11	1st round	SF
2014–15	1	Úrvalsdeild karla	7th	11-11	1st round	2nd round
2015–16	1	Úrvalsdeild karla	5th	14–8	1st round	Runner-up
2016–17	1	Úrvalsdeild karla	5th	12–10	1st round	Runner-up
2017–18	1	Úrvalsdeild karla	9th	9–13	DNQ	1st round
2018–19	1	Úrvalsdeild karla	6th	12–10	Semifinalist	2nd round
2019–20	1	Úrvalsdeild karla	9th	7–14	DNQ	2nd round
2020–21	1	Úrvalsdeild karla	2nd	14–8	Champions	TBD
2021–22	1	Úrvalsdeild karla	TBD	TBD	TBD	TBD

== Women's basketball ==
=== History ===
In May 2020, Þór Þorlákshöfn and Hamar announced that they would field a joint team in the 1. deild kvenna during the upcoming season.

=== Coaches ===
- (Iceland) Hallgrímur Helgason 2020–?
- (Iceland) Davíð Arnar Ágústsson 2026–present

== Trophies and awards ==
=== Trophies ===
- 1. deild kvenna:
  - 2024*

*As Hamar/Þór
