= Skallagrímur (men's basketball) =

Ungmennafélagið Skallagrímur
- Leagues: 1. deild karla
- History: Skallagrímur (1958–present)
- Arena: Fjósið
- Location: Borgarnes, Iceland
- Team colors: Green, yellow
- Website: Skallagrimur.is

The Skallagrímur men's basketball team, commonly known as Skallagrímur, is the men's basketball department of Ungmennafélagið Skallagrímur, based in Borgarnes, Iceland.

== History ==
In 2018, Skallagrímur was promoted to the Úrvalsdeild karla. Following the 2018-2019 season, it was relegated back to 1. deild karla.

== Honours ==
Division I

- Winners (4): 1973, 1991, 2004, 2018

Division II

- Winners (1): 1979

== Individual awards ==
- Úrvalsdeild Men's Foreign Player of the Year
  - Darrell Flake - 2008
- Úrvalsdeild Men's Young Player of the Year
  - Hlynur Bæringsson - 1999
- Úrvalsdeild Men's Coach of the Year
  - Tómas Holton - 1995
- Úrvalsdeild Men's Domestic All-First Team
  - Birgir Mikaelsson - 1993
  - Hlynur Bæringsson - 2002

== Notable players ==
- (Soviet Union) (Iceland) Alexander Ermolinskij
- (Iceland) Axel Kárason
- (Iceland) Birgir Mikaelsson
- (Albania) (Kosovo) Florian Miftari
- (North Macedonia) Dimitar Karadžovski
- (Serbia) Dragiša Šarić
- (Iceland) Gunnar Gunnarsson
- (Iceland) Hlynur Bæringsson
- (Iceland) Magnús Þór Gunnarsson
- (Iceland) Pavel Ermolinskij
- (Iceland) Páll Axel Vilbergsson
- (Iceland) Pétur Már Sigurðsson
- (Iceland) Sigtryggur Arnar Björnsson
- (Iceland) Tómas Holton
- (Iceland) Valur Ingimundarson

== Coaches ==
- (Iceland) Birgir Mikaelsson 1990–1994
- (Iceland) Tómas Holton 1994–1996
- (United States) Terry Upshaw 1996
- (Iceland) Tómas Holton 1997–1998
- (Iceland) Henning Henningsson 1998
- (United States) Eric Franson 1998–1999
- (Serbia) Dragiša Šarić 1999
- (Iceland) Tómas Holton 1999–2000
- (Iceland) Alexander Ermolinskij 2000–2002
- (Iceland) Valur Ingimundarson 2002–2007
- (United States) Ken Webb 2007–2008
- (Iceland) Pálmi Þór Sævarsson and (Iceland) Hafþór Ingi Gunnarsson 2008
- (Serbia) Igor Beljanski 2008–2009
- (Iceland) Pálmi Þór Sævarsson 2009–2014
- (Iceland) Pétur Ingvarsson 2014
- (Iceland) Finnur Jónsson 2015–2019
- (Spain) Manuel Angel Rodriguez Escudero 2019
- (Iceland) Atli Aðalsteinsson 2019–2024
- (Iceland) Pétur Már Sigurðsson 2024–2026
- (Iceland) Pálmi Þór Sævarsson 2024–present
