= 2016–17 Úrvalsdeild karla =

Domino's deild karla^{1}
- Duration: 6 October 2016 – 30 April 2017
- Teams: 12
- TV partner(s): Stöð 2 Sport

Regular season
- Top seed: KR
- Relegated: Skallagrímur, Snæfell

Finals
- Champions: KR (16th title)
- Runners-up: Grindavík
- Finals MVP: (Iceland) Jón Arnór Stefánsson

Awards
- Domestic MVP: (Iceland) Jón Arnór Stefánsson
- Foreign MVP: (United States) Amin Stevens

Statistical leaders
Points	(United States) Amin Stevens	29.5
Rebounds	(United States) Amin Stevens	15.3
Assists	(Iceland) Hörður Vilhjálmsson	6.8
- ^{1} Sponsored league name, referring to Úrvalsdeild karla.

The 2016–17 Úrvalsdeild karla was the 66th season of the Úrvalsdeild karla, the top tier men's basketball league in Iceland. The season started on 6 October 2016 and ended on 30 April 2017. KR won its fourth title in a row by defeating Grindavík 3–2 in the Finals.

== Competition format ==
The participating teams first played a conventional round-robin schedule with every team playing each opponent once "home" and once "away" for a total of 22 games. The top eight teams qualified for the championship playoffs whilst the two last qualified were relegated to Division 1.

== Regular season ==
Pos	Team	Pld	W	L	PF	PA	PD	Pts	Qualification or relegation
1	KR	22	17	5	1920	1732	+188	34	Qualification to playoffs
2	Stjarnan	22	16	6	1884	1715	+169	32	Qualification to playoffs
3	Tindastóll	22	15	7	1957	1794	+163	30	Qualification to playoffs
4	Grindavík	22	13	9	1877	1857	+20	26	Qualification to playoffs
5	Þór Þorl	22	12	10	1856	1769	+87	24	Qualification to playoffs
6	Keflavík	22	11	11	1927	1861	+66	22	Qualification to playoffs
7	ÍR	22	11	11	1767	1764	+3	22	Qualification to playoffs
8	Þór Akureyri	22	11	11	1867	1858	+9	22	Qualification to playoffs
9	Njarðvík	22	10	12	1852	1877	−25	20	
10	Haukar	22	9	13	1819	1821	−2	18	
11	Skallagrímur	22	7	15	1886	2012	−126	14	Relegated
12	Snæfell	22	0	22	1693	2254	−561	0	Relegated

Source: KKÍ

== Playoffs ==
Quarterfinals
1	KR	3
0	Þór Akureyri	0
4	Grindavík	3
5	Þór Þorl	2
(Pairings are reseeded after the first round)
2	Stjarnan	3
7	ÍR	0
3	Tindastóll	1
6	Keflavík	3

Semifinals
1	KR	3
6	Keflavík	1
2	Stjarnan	0
4	Grindavík	3

Finals
1	KR	3
4	Grindavík	2
