= Snæfell (men's basketball) =

- Leagues: 2. deild karla
- Founded: 1964; 61 years ago
- History: Snæfell; 1964–present
- Arena: Íþróttahúsið Stykkishólmi
- Location: Stykkishólmur, Iceland
- Team colors: Red, White, Blue
- President: Gunnar Svanlaugsson
- Head coach: Halldór Steingrímsson
- Championships: 1 Úrvalsdeild karla
- Website: snaefell.is
Home	Away

Snæfell men's basketball, commonly known as Snæfell, is the men's basketball department of Ungmennafélagið Snæfell, based in Stykkishólmur, Iceland.

== History ==
Snæfell won its first and only national championship in 2010, when it defeated Keflavík in the Úrvalsdeild karla finals. It won the Icelandic Basketball Cup in 2008 and 2010. On 27 September 2020, Snæfell withdrew its men's team from competition due to lack of players and financial difficulties.

== Honors ==
- Úrvalsdeild karla (1):
  - 2010
  - Runners-up (3): 2004, 2005, 2008
- Icelandic Basketball Cup (2):
  - 2008, 2010
  - Runners-up (2): 1993, 2003
- Icelandic Basketball Supercup (1):
  - 2010
- Company Cup (3):
  - 2004, 2007, 2010
- 1. deild karla (4):
  - 1974, 1978, 1990, 1998

== European record ==
Season	Competition	Round	Opponent	Away	Home	Aggregate
1993–94	FIBA European Champions Cup	1Q	(Republic of Ireland) St. Vincent's	75–78	79–77	154–155

== Notable players ==
Note: Flags indicate national team eligibility at FIBA-sanctioned events. Players may hold other non-FIBA nationalities not displayed.

Criteria

To appear in this section a player must have either:

- Set a club record or won an individual award while at the club
- Played at least one official international match for their national team at any time
- Played at least one official NBA match at any time.

- (Iceland) (Sweden) Andrée Michelsson
- (Iceland) Bárður Eyþórsson
- (Iceland) Birgir Mikaelsson
- (Iceland) Clifton Bush
- (Iceland) Hlynur Bæringsson
- (Iceland) Ívar Ásgrímsson
- (United States) Jay Threatt
- (United States) Jeb Ivey
- (Iceland) Jón Ólafur Jónsson
- (United States) Justin Shouse
- (Iceland) Pálmi Freyr Sigurgeirsson
- (Iceland) Ríkharður Hrafnkelsson
- (United States) Ryan Amoroso
- (United States) Shawn Jamison
- (Iceland) Sigurður Þorvaldsson
- (Iceland) Stefán Karel Torfason
- (Iceland) Sverrir Þór Sverrisson

== Coaches ==
- (Iceland) Bárður Eyþórsson
- (Iceland) Ívar Ásgrímsson
- (United States) Geof Kotila (2006-2008)
- (Iceland) Hlynur Bæringsson and Sigurður Þorvaldsson (2008-2009)
- (Iceland) Ingi Þór Steinþórsson (2009-2018)
- (Croatia) Vlaldimir Ivankovic (2018-2019)
- (Iceland) Baldur Þorleifsson and Jón Þór Eyþórsson (2019)
- (United States) Benjamin Young Kil (2019-2020)
- (Iceland) Halldór Steingrímsson (2020-present)
