= Stjarnan (men's basketball) =

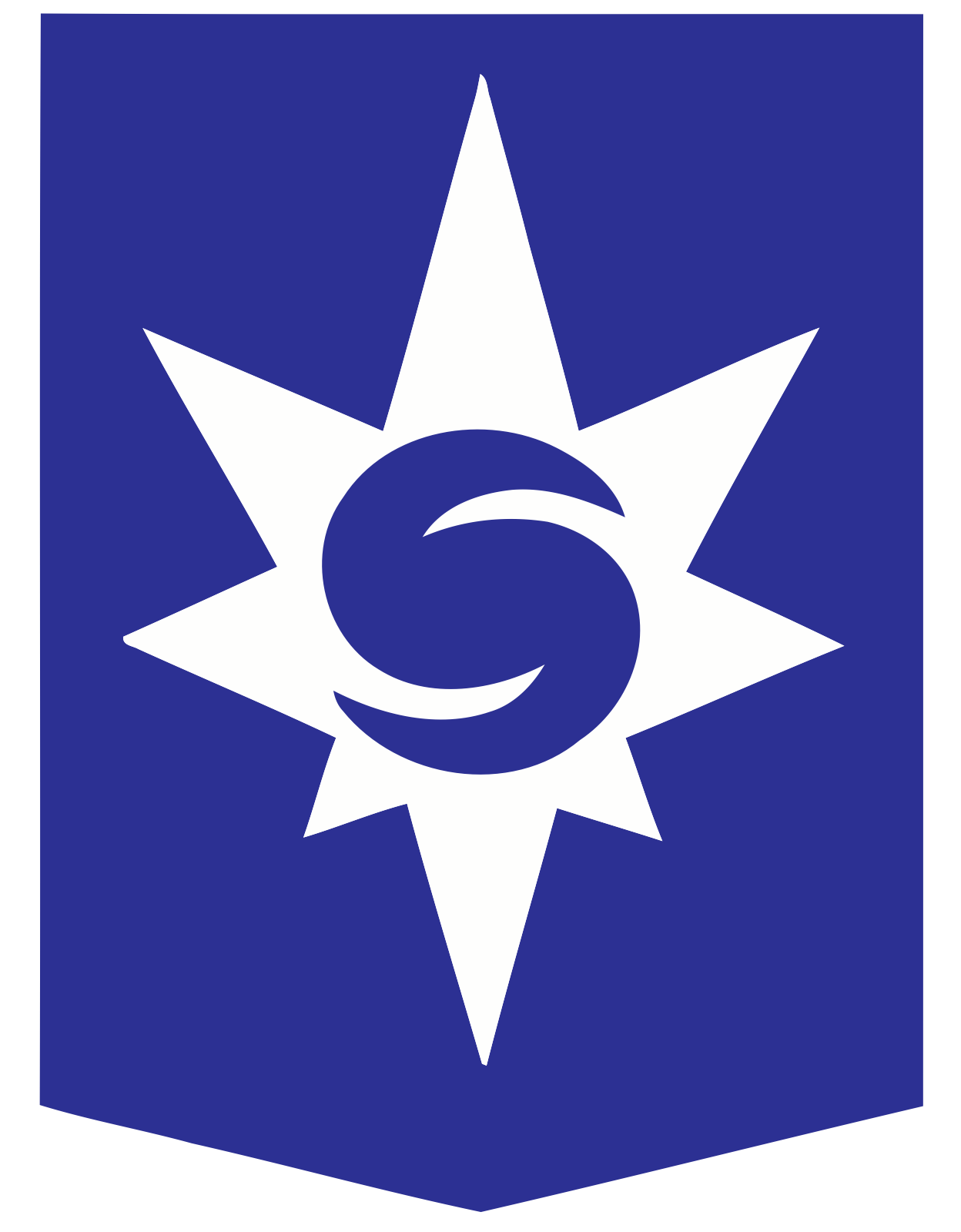
- Leagues: Úrvalsdeild karla
- Founded: 1993; 33 years ago
- History: Stjarnan; 1993–present
- Arena: Ásgarður
- Location: Garðabær, Iceland
- Team colors: Blue, White
- President: Hilmar Júlíusson
- Affiliation: Álftanes
- Championships: 1 (2025)
- Retired numbers: 1 (12)
- Website: Stjarnan.is
Home	Away

The Stjarnan men's basketball team, commonly known as Stjarnan, is the men's basketball department of Ungmennafélagið Stjarnan, based in the town of Garðabær, Iceland. It is a subdivision of Ungmennafélagið Stjarnan.

== History ==
Stjarnan's men's basketball team was founded in 1993. It reached the Icelandic top-tier Úrvalsdeild karla in 2001. After losing all its games during the 2001–02 season, the team almost folded. It managed to stay afloat and reached the Úrvalsdeild again in 2007 and advanced to the Úrvalsdeild Finals in 2011 and 2013, losing both times. It won the Icelandic Basketball Cup in 2009, 2013, 2015, 2019 and 2020.

On 14 March 2019, Stjarnan defeated Haukar in the last game of the regular season and finished with the best record in the league, winning the Division championship and a home court advantage through the playoffs.

Stjarnan opened the 2019–20 season with an 89-77 win against reigning champions KR in the annual Icelandic Super Cup behind newly signed Kyle Johnson's 21 points. On 15 February 2020, the team repeated as Cup champions after beating Grindavík in the cup final.

On 27 September 2020, Stjarnan won the Super Cup for the second consecutive season.

On 21 May 2025, Stjarnan won its first ever national championship.

== Honors ==
- Úrvalsdeild karla (1):

2025

- Icelandic Basketball Cup (6):

2009, 2013, 2015, 2019, 2020, 2022

- Icelandic Super Cup (3):

2009, 2019, 2020

- Company Cup (1):

2015

- Division II (1):

1995

== Players ==
=== Individual awards ===
- Úrvalsdeild Domestic Player of the Year
  - Justin Shouse – 2012, 2013
  - Ægir Steinarsson - 2025
- Úrvalsdeild Foreign Player of the Year
  - Justin Shouse – 2010
- Úrvalsdeild Domestic All-First Team
  - Hlynur Bæringsson – 2017, 2018, 2019
  - Justin Shouse – 2012, 2013
  - Ægir Steinarsson – 2019, 2021, 2024, 2025, 2026
- Úrvalsdeild Defensive Player of the Year
  - Hlynur Bæringsson – 2017
  - Ægir Steinarsson – 2019, 2025, 2026
- Icelandic Cup Finals MVP
  - Jarrid Frye – 2013
  - Justin Shouse – 2015
  - Brandon Rozzell – 2019
  - Ægir Steinarsson – 2020
  - David Gabrovšek – 2022
- Icelandic Finals MVP
  - Ægir Steinarsson - 2025

=== Notable players ===
Note: Flags indicate national team eligibility at FIBA-sanctioned events. Players may hold other non-FIBA nationalities not displayed.

Criteria

To appear in this section a player must have either:

- Set a club record or won an individual award while at the club
- Played at least one official international match for their national team at any time
- Played at least one official NBA match at any time.

- (Sweden) Alexander Lindqvist
- (Niger) Anthony Odunsi
- (Finland) Antti Kanervo
- (United States) Brandon Rozzell
- (Iceland) Collin Pryor
- (Iceland) Dagur Kár Jónsson
- (Slovakia) David Gabrovšek
- (North Macedonia) Dimitar Karadžovski
- (Iceland) Gunnar Ólafsson
- (Iceland) Hilmar Smári Henningsson
- (Iceland) Hlynur Bæringsson
- (United States) Jarrid Frye
- (Slovenia) Jaka Klobučar
- (Iceland) Jón Kr. Gíslason
- (Iceland) Jón Ólafur Jónsson
- (Iceland) Justin Shouse
- (United Kingdom) Kyle Johnson
- (Kosovo) Mujo Thaçi
- (Iceland) Orri Gunnarsson
- (Iceland) Ragnar Nathanaelsson
- (Finland) Shawn Hopkins
- (Iceland) Tómas Þórður Hilmarsson
- (Iceland) Ægir Þór Steinarsson

=== Retired numbers ===
Stjarnan retired numbers
No.	Player	Position	Tenure	No. Retirement
12	Justin Shouse	PG	2008–2017	27 January 2019

== Coaches ==
- (Iceland) Björn Leósson 1993–2000
- (Iceland) Jón Kr. Gíslason 2000–2001
- (Iceland) Jón Guðmundsson 2001
- (United States) Kevin Grandberg 2002
- (Iceland) Bragi Magnússon and
  (Iceland) Þorvaldur Henningsson 2003–2004
- (Iceland) Þorvaldur Henningsson 2005
- (Iceland) Birgir Guðfinnsson 2005
- (United States) Derrick Stevens 2006
- (Iceland) Bragi Magnússon 2006–2008
- (Iceland) Eyjólfur Örn Jónsson and
  (Iceland) Jón Kr. Gíslason 2008
- (Iceland) Teitur Örlygsson 2008–2014
- (Iceland) Hrafn Kristjánsson 2014–2018
- (Iceland) Arnar Guðjónsson 2018–2024
- (Iceland) Baldur Þór Ragnarsson 2024–2026
- (Iceland) Emil Barja 2026–present
