= Kolbeinn Pálsson =

Icelandic basketball player (born 1945)

12th Chairman of KKÍ
- In office 1988–1996
- Preceded by: Björn Björgvinsson
- Succeeded by: Ólafur Rafnsson

Personal details
- Born: 26 November 1945 (age 80) Iceland
- Basketball career

Career information
- Playing career: 1962–1981

Career history
- 1962–1979: KR
- 1980–1981: KR

Career highlights
- Icelandic Sportsperson of the Year (1966); 7x Icelandic League champion (1965–1968, 1974, 1978, 1979); 7x Icelandic Basketball Cup (1970–1974, 1977, 1979)

Kolbeinn Hermann Pálsson (born 26 November 1945) is an Icelandic former basketball player and a former member of the Icelandic national team. In 1966 he became the first basketball player to be named the Icelandic Sportsperson of the Year. He served as the chairman of the Icelandic Basketball Association from 1988 to 1996.

== Early life ==
Kolbeinn started playing basketball at the age of 14. During his youth he was an avid Handball player and played with KR in the Icelandic top-tier handball league during the 1962–1963 before focusing fully on basketball.

== Playing career ==
Kolbeinn spent his entire career with KR, playing a total of 383 games for the club. He last played during the 1980-1981 season, appearing in 4 games. On 18 November 1966 he scored 25 points against defending champions Simmenthal Milano in the FIBA European Champions Cup (now called EuroLeague).

On 1 December 1977 Kolbeinn ruptured his left achilles tendon in a game against Valur. He managed to return before the end of the season and participated in the extra game between KR and Njarðvík where KR won the national championship.

== National team ==
Kolbeinn played 55 games for the Icelandic national team from 1966 to 1976. He played his first game in 1966 against Poland. In 1966 he made two free throws in the final seconds of Iceland's game against Denmark, giving them victory and the bronze in the 1966 Nordic Championships.

== Awards, titles and accomplishments ==
=== Individual awards ===
- Icelandic Sportsperson of the Year: 1966

=== Titles ===
- Icelandic champion (7): 1965, 1966, 1967, 1968, 1974, 1978, 1979
- Icelandic Basketball Cup (7): 1970, 1971, 1972, 1973, 1974, 1977, 1979

== Personal life ==
Kolbeinn is the father of former Icelandic national team player Páll Kolbeinsson. His sister, Vigdís Pálsdóttir, played handball for Valur.
