= Tómas Holton =

Icelandic former basketball player and coach

Personal information
- Born: 8 July 1964 (age 62) Iceland

Career information
- Playing career: 1982–2002
- Position: Point guard
- Coaching career: 1987–2017

Career history

Playing
- 1982–1989: Valur
- 1989–1990: Budapesti Honvéd
- 1990–1991: TFSE
- 1991–1992: Valur
- 1992–1994: Ammerud Basket
- 1994–2000: Skallagrímur
- 2001–2002: Oslo Kings

Coaching
- 1987–1989: ÍS (W)
- 1991–1992: Valur (M)
- 1994–1996: Skallagrímur (M)
- 1997–1998: Skallagrímur (M)
- 1999–2000: Skallagrímur (M)
- 2010: Fjölnir (M)
- 2011–2012: Fjölnir (M, assistant)
- 2012: Iceland (M, assistant)
- 2016–2017: Valur (W, assistant)

Career highlights
- As player: Icelandic champion (1983); Icelandic Cup (1983); Úrvalsdeild Domestic All-First Team (1989); 2× Úrvalsdeild karla assist leader (1995, 2000); As coach: Úrvalsdeild karla Coach of the Year

Career Úrvalsdeild karla playing statistics
- Points: 3,897 (12.2 ppg)
- Games: 319

Career coaching record
- Úrvalsdeild karla: 67–66 (.504)
- Úrvalsdeild kvenna: 25–11 (.694)

Tómas Albert Tómasson Holton (born 8 July 1964) is an Icelandic former basketball player and coach. In 1983, he won the Icelandic championship and the Icelandic Cup as a member of Valur. Playing the point guard position, he led the Úrvalsdeild karla in assists in 1995 and 2000.

== Playing career ==
=== Club career ===
Tómas started his senior team career with Valur during the 1981-82 season and with them won the national championship and Iceland Cup in 1983. In 1989, he left the team to play for Budapesti Honvéd in the Hungary Basketball League. The following season he stayed in Hungary and signed with TFSE. He returned to Valur in 1991 for one season as a player-coach before signing with Ammerud Basket in Norway in 1992. From 1994 to 2000, he played for Skallagrímur.

=== National team career ===
Tómas played 55 games for the Icelandic national team from 1985 to 1992.

== Coaching career ==
Tómas coached ÍS women's team from 1987 to 1989. In 1991, he took over as a player-coach for Valur, replacing Vladimir Obuchov who was fired after a 2-4 start. He guided the team to the Úrvalsdeild finals where it lost to Keflavík.

He was the head coach of Skallagrímur from 1994 to 1996, 1997 to 1998 and again from 1999 to 2000.

In June 2010, he was hired as the head coach of Fjölnir, replacing Bárður Eyþórsson. He resigned in November the same year after losing the first two games of the season. In September 2011, he returned to Fjölnir as an assistant coach. In August 2012, he replaced Helgi Jónas Guðfinnsson as an assistant to the Icelandic men's national team. In January 2016, he was hired as an assistant coach to Valur women's team. He remained with the team the following season.

=== Coaching record ===
Season	League	Team	Wins	Losses	%	Playoffs	Notes
1987–88	Úrvalsdeild kvenna	ÍS	14	4	78%	N/A	Runner-up
1988–89	Úrvalsdeild kvenna	ÍS	11	7	61%	N/A	
1991-92	Úrvalsdeild karla	Valur	12	8	60%	Finals	Hired in end of October
1994-95	Úrvalsdeild karla	Skallagrímur	18	14	56%	Semi-finals	
1995-96	Úrvalsdeild karla	Skallagrímur	16	16	60%	1st round	
1996-97	Úrvalsdeild karla	Skallagrímur	6	5	55%	1st round	Hired in January
1997-98	Úrvalsdeild karla	Skallagrímur	9	13	41%	DNQ	
1999-00	Úrvalsdeild karla	Skallagrímur	6	8	43%	DNQ	
2010-11	Úrvalsdeild karla	Fjölnir	0	2	0%	N/A	Resigned in October

== Personal life ==
Tómas is married to Anna Björk Bjarnadóttir, a former member of the Icelandic women's national basketball team. Together they have three children and two of them, Bergþóra Holton Tómasdóttir and Tómas Heiðar Tómasson, played basketball in the Icelandic top-tier leagues. Tómas' uncle was Helgi Jóhannsson, one of the main pioneers of modern basketball in Iceland.
