= 1979–80 Úrvalsdeild karla =

Úrvalsdeild karla
- Duration: October 13, 1979 – March 17, 1980
- Games played: 60
- Teams: 6

Regular season
- Relegated: Fram

Finals
- Champions: Valur (1st title)
- Runners-up: Njarðvík

Awards
- Domestic MVP: (Iceland) Guðsteinn Ingimarsson
- Foreign MVP: (United States) Tim Dwyer

Statistical leaders
| Points | (United States) Trent Smock | 34.6 |

The 1979–80 Úrvalsdeild karla was the 29th season of the Úrvalsdeild karla, the top tier men's basketball league on Iceland. The season started on October 13, 1979 and ended on March 17, 1980. Valur won its first title by posting the best record in the league with a win against KR in the last day of the season.

== Competition format ==
The participating teams first played a conventional round-robin schedule with every team playing each opponent twice "home" and twice "away" for a total of 20 games. The top team won the national championship whilst the bottom team was relegated to Division I.

== Regular season ==
| Pos | Team | Pld | W | L | PF | PA | PD | Pts | Qualification or relegation |
|---|---|---|---|---|---|---|---|---|---|
| 1 | Valur | 20 | 16 | 4 | 1813 | 1689 | +124 | 32 | Champion |
| 2 | Njarðvík | 20 | 15 | 5 | 1692 | 1581 | +111 | 30 | |
| 3 | KR | 20 | 11 | 9 | 1672 | 1608 | +64 | 22 | |
| 4 | ÍR | 20 | 10 | 10 | 1813 | 1833 | −20 | 20 | |
| 5 | ÍS | 20 | 5 | 15 | 1699 | 1815 | −116 | 10 | |
| 6 | Fram | 20 | 3 | 17 | 1577 | 1740 | −163 | 6 | Relegated |

== Notable occurrences ==
- On 17 November, John Johnson set a Úrvalsdeild record when he scored 71 points in Fram's 104-92 victory against ÍS. At the time it was also the most points scored by a player in the country, breaking Danny Shouse's record of 70 points in the annual Reykjavík Basketball Tournament in September 1979. Shouse would break the record later in the year when he scored 100 points in the second-tier Division I.
- On 17 November, Njarvíkur's player Gunnar Þorvarðarson scored a basket as the final buzzer sounded in a game against rivals Valur. Initially referee Sigurður Valur called the basket off while referee Þráinn Skúlason maintained that Gunnar had released the ball before the buzzer sounded. After a 20-minute conversation in a locked room with other game officials it was ruled that the basket was valid, giving Njarðvík á 88-87 victory.
