= 1958 Úrvalsdeild karla (basketball) =

Icelandic Basketball Tournament^{1}
- Duration: 21 February 1958 – 27 March 1958
- Games played: 15
- Teams: 6

Finals
- Champions: ÍKF (4th title)
- Runners-up: ÍS

Records
- Highest scoring: KFR-b 22–106 ÍKF (12 March 1958)
- Winning streak: ÍKF; 4 games
- Losing streak: KR; 5 games
- ^{1} The league changed its name to Úrvalsdeild karla in 1978.

The 1958 Icelandic Basketball Tournament was the 7th season of the top tier men's basketball league in Iceland. The season started on 21 February 1958 and ended on 27 March 1958. ÍKF won its fourth title by posting the best record in the league.

== Competition format ==
The participating teams played each other once for a total of 5 games. The top team won the national championship.

== Results ==
21 February 1958

ÍS	62–34	KR
Pts: Hilmir Sigurðsson 21

Hálogaland, Reykjavík
Referees: Ingi Þorsteinsson and Geir Kristjánsson

21 February 1958

ÍR	54–43 (Note: Alþýðublaðið lists the final score as 52–44 while Morgunblaðið and the Icelandic Basketball Association list it as 54–43.)	ÍKF

Hálogaland, Reykjavík
Referees: Þórir Ólafsson and Kristinn Jóhannsson

24 February 1958

ÍR	48–28	KR
Scoring by half: 16–11, 32–17

Hálogaland, Reykjavík
Referees: Guðmundur Georgsson and Geir Kristjánsson

24 February 1958

ÍS	84–24 (Note: Morgunblaðið and Þjóðviljinn list the final score as 83–24 while Vísir and the Icelandic Basketball Association list it as 84–24.)	KFR-b
Pts: Þórir Ólafsson 32

Hálogaland, Reykjavík
Referees: Helgi Jóhannsson and Ingi Þór Stefánsson

4 March 1958

ÍKF	60–24	KR
Scoring by half: 24–9, 36–15
Pts: Friðrik Bjarnason 23		Pts: Sigurður Gíslason 8

Hálogaland, Reykjavík

4 March 1958

ÍS	37–26 (Note: Alþýðublaðið list the final score as 36–26 while Morgunblaðið, Þjóðviljinn and the Icelandic Basketball Association list it as 37–26.)	KFR
Scoring by half: 16–14, 21–12
Pts: Þórir Ólafsson 12

Hálogaland, Reykjavík

6 March 1958

ÍKF	38–34	ÍS
Scoring by half: 25–20, 13–14

Hálogaland, Reykjavík
Referees: Ingi Þór

6 March 1958

KFR	47–22	KFR-b

Hálogaland, Reykjavík

12 March 1958

ÍKF	106–22	KFR-b
Scoring by half: 45–13, 61–9
Pts: Hjálmar 35

Hálogaland, Reykjavík

12 March 1958

KFR	46–41	KR
Scoring by half: 21–18, 25–23

Hálogaland, Reykjavík

17 March 1958

KFR	45–41	ÍR
Scoring by half: 21–23, 24–18
Pts: Guðmundur Georgsson 16		Pts: Steinþór 13

Hálogaland, Reykjavík

17 March 1958

KFR-b	44–28 (Note: Morgunblaðið list the final score as 44–23 and Þjóðviljinn as 43–28, while Alþýðublaðið and the Icelandic Basketball Association list it as 44–28.)	KR

Hálogaland, Reykjavík

21 March 1958
20:00

ÍKF	33–30	KFR
Scoring by half: 17–17, 16–13

Hálogaland, Reykjavík

21 March 1958

ÍR	60–31	KFR-b
Scoring by half: 21–14, 39–17

Hálogaland, Reykjavík

27 March 1958

ÍS	54–53	ÍR
Scoring by half: 29–27, 25–26

Hálogaland, Reykjavík

== Regular season ==
Pos	Team	Pld	W	L	PF	PA	PD	Pts	Qualification or relegation
1	ÍKF	5	4	1	281	162	+119	8	Champion
2	ÍS	5	4	1	270	175	+95	8	
3	KFR	5	3	2	194	174	+20	6	
4	ÍR	5	3	2	254	202	+52	6	
5	KFR-b	5	1	4	143	324	−181	2	
6	KR	5	0	5	155	260	−105	0	
