= Torfi Magnússon =

Icelandic basketball player

Personal information
- Born: 6 June 1955 (age 71) Iceland
- Listed height: 195 cm (6 ft 5 in)

Career information
- Playing career: 1972–1995
- Position: Center
- Coaching career: 1983–2001

Career history

Playing
- 1972–1988: Valur
- 1989–1992: Víkverji
- 1993–1995: Leiknir Reykjavík

Coaching
- 1983–1986: Valur
- 1988–1989: Valur
- 1989–1990: Haukar
- 1989–1993: Iceland (W)
- 1990–1995: Iceland (M)
- 1995–1997: Valur
- 2000–2001: Valur/Fjölnir

Career highlights
- As player: Icelandic basketball team of the 20th century; Icelandic Basketball Player of the Year (1980); Úrvalsdeild Domestic Player of the Year (1982); Úrvalsdeild Defensive Player of the Year (1984); 2x Icelandic champion (1980, 1983); 3x Icelandic Cup (1980, 1981, 1983); As coach: 1. deild karla champion (1997); 1. deild karla Coach of the Year (1997)

Career coaching record
- Úrvalsdeild karla: 57–78 (.422)

Torfi Magnússon (born 6 June 1955) is an Icelandic former basketball player and a former member of the Icelandic national basketball team. He was named the Icelandic Basketball Player of the Year in 1980 and won two national championships with Valur in the 1980s. In 2001, he was named to the Icelandic basketball team of the 20th century on the 40 year anniversary of the Icelandic Basketball Federation.

== Playing career ==
Torfi started his senior career with Valur during the 1972–1973 season. He spent 16 seasons with Valur, winning the national championship in 1980 and 1983. In 1984, he was named the Úrvalsdeild Defensive Player of the Year.

Torfi, along with several former national team players, joined 1. deild karla club Víkverjar in October 1989. Víkverjar finished second in the league and played a promotion playoffs game against Þór Akureyri, who finished second-to-last in the Úrvalsdeild. In the game, Þór blew out Víkverjar 94–53, with Torfi scoring a game high 26 points.

== National team career ==
From 1974 to 1987, Torfi played 131 games for the Icelandic national basketball team.

== Coaching career ==
Torfi was hired as the head coach of Haukar in late December 1989, replacing player-coach Pálmar Sigurðsson, who continued to play for the club. After the season, Torfi was hired as the head coach of the Icelandic men's national basketball team where he served until June 1995.

In July 1995, Torfi returned to Valur when he was hired as the head coach of the men's team. In 1997 he guided Valur to victory in 1. deild karla and promotion back to the Úrvalsdeild. For his effort, he was named the 1. deild karla Coach of the Year. He stepped down after the season and was replaced by Svali Björgvinsson.

In end of October 2000, Torfi returned to the sidelines, replacing recently fired Pétur Guðmundsson as the head coach of Valur/Fjölnir. He was unable to turn the team's fortunes as it was relegated to 1. deild karla at the season's end.
