= John Johnson (basketball, born 1956) =

American basketball player (born 1956)

Personal information
- Born: July 12, 1955 (age 71) Los Angeles, California, U.S.
- Listed height: 187 cm (6 ft 2 in)

Career information
- High school: Alhambra High School
- Position: Guard

Career history

Playing
- 1978–1979: Fram
- 1978: →ÍS
- 1979–1981: ÍA
- 1980: →Valur
- 1994: Selfoss

Coaching
- 1978–1979: Fram
- 1979–1980: Valur (assistant)
- 1979–1981: ÍA

Career highlights
- As player: Icelandic D1 winner (1979); As coach: Icelandic D1 winner (1979); As assistant coach: Úrvalsdeild karla champion (1980); Icelandic cup winner (1980)

Jonathan M. Johnson (born 12 July 1955) is an American former basketball player and coach. He was part of the first influx of foreign basketball players in Iceland in the late 1970s. In 1979, he set the single game scoring record in the Icelandic top-tier Úrvalsdeild karla when he scored 71 points for Fram against ÍS. In 1980, he won the Icelandic championship and the Icelandic cup as an assistant coach with Valur.

== Early life ==
Johnson was born and grew up in Los Angeles.

== Professional career ==
In August 1978, Johnson signed as a player-coach with Fram in the Icelandic second-tier 1. deild karla. In his debut on 23 September, he scored 55 points in Fram's 93–81 victory against Ármann in the annual pre-season Reykjavík Basketball Tournament. He led the team to the tournament finals where the team lost to Valur despite Johnson scoring 41 points. On 12 November, he scored 52 points in a victory against KFÍ.

In November 1978, Johnson was loaned to ÍS for their upcoming games against FC Barcelona in the 1978–79 FIBA European Cup Winners' Cup. Although Johnson played well and scored 24 points in both games, ÍS suffered a lopsided losses.

At the season's end, Fram finished first in the league and achieved promotion to the top-tier Úrvalsdeild karla. After some uncertainty of his return due to Fram's poor financial situation, Johnson re-signed with the team for the 1979–80 season.

On 17 November 1979, Johnson set the Úrvalsdeild single game scoring record when he scored 71 points in a victory against ÍS. In the beginning of December, tension between Johnson and the team reached a breaking point with Johnson being unhappy with the lateness of his salary while the board of the team was unhappy with his temperament. In the end, Johnson left the team after playing 7 games where he averaged 35.0 points per game.

After his departure from Fram, he served as an assistant coach to Tim Dwyer of Valur where he would win the national championship and the Icelandic cup in March 1980. Alongside assisting Dwyer, Johnson was hired as a player-coach for 2. deild karla club ÍA in December 1979. Johnson re-signed with ÍA the following season and in October 1980 he was loaned to Valur for its upcoming games against Cibona Zagreb in the FIBA European Cup Winners' Cup. After scoring only 14 points in the first game between the teams, Johnson scored a game high 31 points in the second game.

In 1994, Johnson signed with 1. deild karla club Ungmennafélag Selfoss. He was released by the team after appearing in 7 games.
