= 1959 Úrvalsdeild karla (basketball) =

Men's basketball in Iceland

Icelandic Basketball Tournament^{1}
- Duration: 15 March 1959 – 17 April 1959
- Games played: 6
- Teams: 4

Finals
- Champions: ÍS (1st title)
- Runners-up: ÍR

Records
- Highest scoring: ÍS 62–58 ÍR (14 April 1959)
- ^{1} The league changed its name to Úrvalsdeild karla in 1978.

The 1959 Icelandic Basketball Tournament was the 8th season of the top tier men's basketball in Iceland. It was organized by Körfuknattleiksráð Reykjavíkur and started on 15 March 1959 and ended on 17 April 1959. ÍS won its first title by posting the best record in the league.

== Competition format ==
The participating teams played each other once for a total of 3 games and the top placed team won the national championship. If two teams where tied at the season's end in first place, an extra game would be played for the championship. The 1959 tournament used was the first one to use the new rulebook, translated by Bogi Þorsteinsson and Benedikt Jakobsson.

== Results ==
15 March 1959

ÍR	44–42	KFR
Scoring by half: 22–23, 22–19
Pts: Lárus Lárusson 11		Pts: Ingi Þorsteinsson 12

Hálogaland, Reykjavík
Referees: Ingi Gunnarsson and Birgir Birgis

19 March 1959

ÍS	52–52	ÍKF
Pts: Guðni Guðnason Sr. 19

Hálogaland, Reykjavík

23 March 1959

ÍR	42–33	ÍKF
Scoring by half: 19–21, 23–12

Hálogaland, Reykjavík

31 March 1959

ÍS	49–43	KFR
Scoring by half: 19–19, 30–24
Pts: Þórir Arinbjarnarson 14

Hálogaland, Reykjavík

14 April 1959

ÍS	62–58	ÍR
Scoring by half: 33–23, 29–35
Pts: Þórir Arinbjarnarson 19		Pts: Helgi Jónsson 20

Hálogaland, Reykjavík
Referees: Ásgeir Guðmundsson and Ingi Gunnarsson

17 April 1959

ÍKF	59–49 (Note: Alþýðublaðið lists the final score as 58–49 while the Icelandic Basketball Association lists it as 59–49.)	KFR

Hálogaland, Reykjavík

== Table ==
Pos	Team	Pld	W	D	L	PF	PA	PD	Pts	Qualification or relegation
1	ÍS	3	2	1	0	163	153	+10	5	Champion
2	ÍR	3	2	0	1	144	137	+7	4	
3	ÍKF	3	1	1	1	143	143	0	3	
4	KFR	3	0	0	3	134	151	−17	0	

Source: KKI.is
