= Kristófer Acox =

Icelandic basketball player

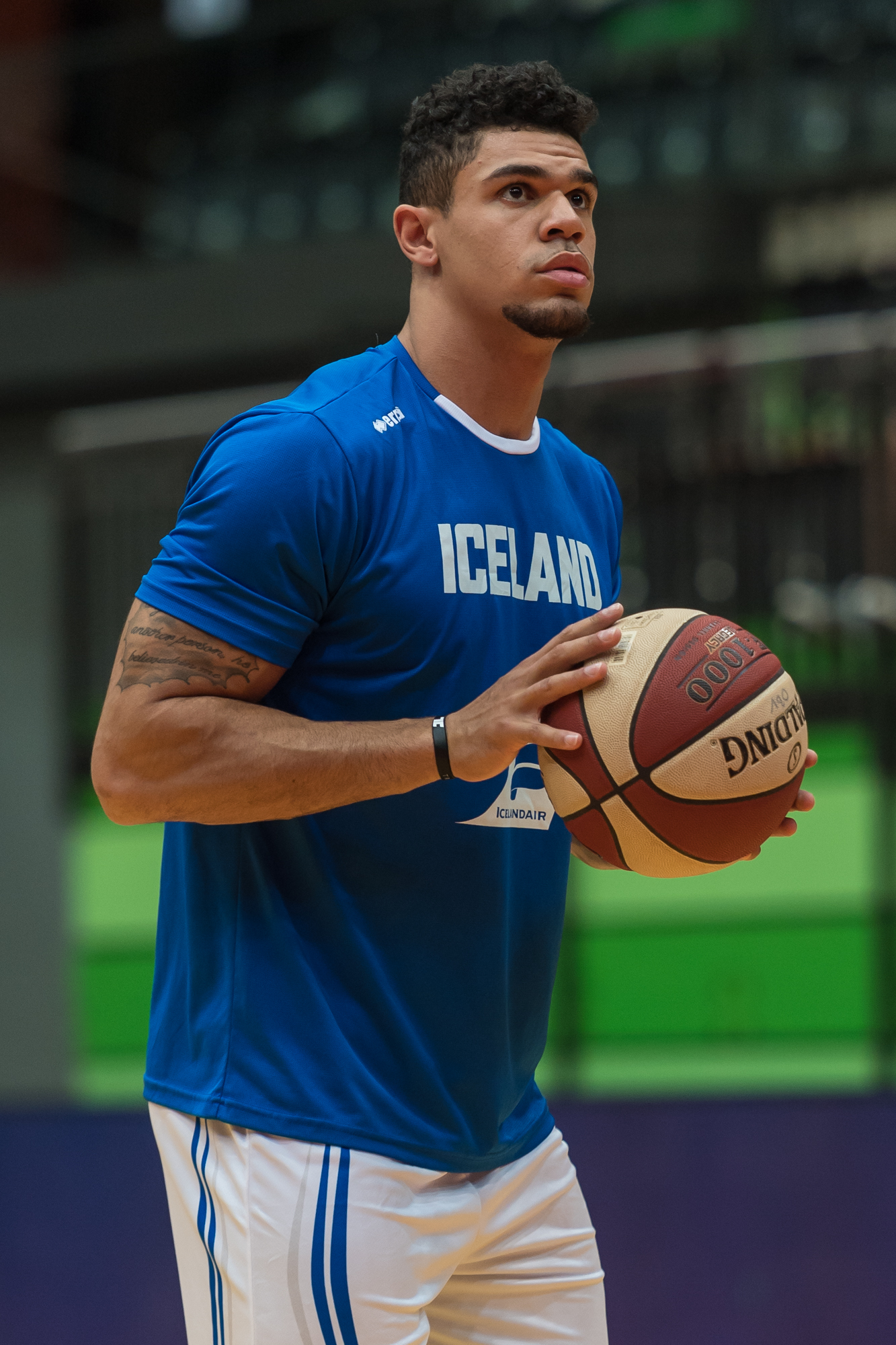

No. 13 – Valur
- Position: Power forward
- League: Úrvalsdeild karla

Personal information
- Born: 13 October 1993 (age 33) Akranes, Iceland
- Listed height: 198 cm (6 ft 6 in)
- Listed weight: 101 kg (223 lb)

Career information
- High school: Spring Valley (Columbia, South Carolina)
- College: Furman (2013–2017)
- Playing career: 2009–present

Career history
- 2009–2010: KR
- 2011–2013: KR
- 2017: KR
- 2017: Star Hotshots
- 2017–2018: KR
- 2018: Denain Voltaire
- 2018–2020: KR
- 2020–present: Valur

Career highlights
- 3× Úrvalsdeild Domestic Player of the Year (2018, 2019, 2022); Úrvalsdeild Playoffs MVP (2018); 5× Úrvalsdeild Domestic All-First Team (2018, 2019, 2021, 2022, 2024); Úrvalsdeild Defensive Player of the Year (2018); 5× Icelandic League champion (2017–2019, 2022, 2024); 2×Icelandic Cup (2023, 2025); 2×Icelandic Super Cup (2022, 2023)
Medals
Men's basketball
Representing Iceland
Games of the Small States of Europe
Silver medal – second place	2015 Reykjavik	National Team
Bronze medal – third place	2017 San Marino	National Team

Kristófer Acox (born 13 October 1993) is an Icelandic basketball player for Valur of the Úrvalsdeild karla and a member of the Icelandic national basketball team, with whom he participated in the EuroBasket 2017. As a member of KR, he won the Icelandic championship three times in a row from 2017 to 2019. In 2022, he added his fourth championship, this time with Valur and in 2023, he won the Icelandic Cup for the first time.

== Early years ==
Kristófer was born on 13 October 1993 to Edna María Jacobsen, who is half Icelandic and half Faroese, and Terry Acox, an American basketball player who played professionally in Iceland with Körfuknattleiksfélag ÍA. He grew up with his mother and grandmother. Kristófer played both football and basketball in his youth for nine years, turning fully to basketball at the age of fourteen after being selected to the Icelandic U-15 national basketball team.

== Playing career ==
Kristófer played for four years at Furman University. After finishing his college season in April 2017, he joined KR where he won the national championship.

He played for the Star Hotshots of the Philippine Basketball Association (PBA) from September to October 2017 when he returned to KR.

On 28 April 2018, Kristófer won his second consecutive national championship with KR after beating Tindastóll 3–1 in the Úrvalsdeild Finals where he was also named the Úrvalsdeild Playoffs MVP. After the season he was named both the Úrvalsdeild Karla Domestic Player of the Year and the Úrvalsdeild Karla Defensive Player of the Year, and to the Úrvalsdeild Karla Domestic All-First Team.

On 12 June 2018, Kristófer signed a two-year contract extension with KR with the option to leave if he received an offer from a bigger club. On 28 June, he exercised that option and signed with Denain Voltaire of the French LNB Pro B. After struggling with ankle injuries and unhappiness with living in a mostly non-English speaking city, he reached an agreement with the club to be released from contract in middle of November that year. Shortly later he signed back with KR for the rest of the season.

On 4 May 2019 he won his third national championship in a row with KR. After the season he was named the Domestic Player of the Year for the second year in a row.

In December 2019, Kristófer was hospitalised due to a kidney infection.

On 7 September 2020, Kristófer announced that he was leaving KR due to a disagreement between him and the club. Four days later, he signed with Reykjavík rivals Valur. On 24 September, it was reported that KR was refusing to sign Kristófer's transfer papers to Valur despite reportedly owing him millions ISK in unpaid salaries. In turn, Páll Kolbeinsson, a board member of KR's basketball department, stated that the board believed that it did not owe Kristófer any unpaid salary. He further claimed that board believed that he had hid the extent of his injuries before signing a contract extension in 2019 although evidence did show that both the then head coach Ingi Þór Steinþórsson and KR's physiotherapist where aware of them. On 30 September, KR signed Kristófer's transfer papers, officially making him a Valur player. After successfully suing KR, the team was ordered by the District Court of Reykjavík to pay him 10.3 millions ISK in unpaid salaries and 1.4 millions ISK for court costs.

In his Valur debut, Kristófer had 29 points and 13 rebounds in a 76–81 loss against Stjarnan. For the season he averaged 12.7 points and 7.5 rebounds and helped Valur finish 4th and secure their first playoff seat since 1992. In the playoffs, Valur lost to KR in five games in the first round.

During his second season við Valur, Kristófer upped his averages to 15.0 points and 11.3 rebounds with Valur finishing third in the league during the regular season. On 18 May 2022, he won his fourth national championship when Valur defeated Tindastóll in the Úrvalsdeild finals.

On 2 October 2022, he won the Icelandic Super Cup with Valur. On 14 January 2023, he won the Icelandic Cup after Valur defeated Stjarnan in the Cup final.

On 24 September 2023, he won the Icelandic Super Cup after Valur defeated Tindastóll 80–72. He won the national championship in 2024 but suffered a knee injury 20 seconds into the fifth and deciding game in the finals. During the summer he had operations on both knees.

On 22 March 2025, he won the Icelandic Cup after Valur defeated KR in the Cup finals, 96–78.

== Awards and accomplishments ==
=== Club honours ===
- Icelandic Champion (5): 2017, 2018, 2019, 2022, 2024
- Icelandic Cup : 2023, 2025
- Icelandic Super Cup : 2022, 2023

=== Individual awards ===
- Úrvalsdeild Domestic Player of the Year : 2018, 2019, 2022
- Úrvalsdeild Domestic All-First team : 2018, 2019, 2021, 2022
- Úrvalsdeild Playoffs MVP : 2018
- Úrvalsdeild Defensive Player of the Year: 2018
