= Úrvalsdeild Men's Defensive Player of the Year =

The Men's Defensive Player of the Year is an award for the top-tier basketball league in Iceland, the men's Úrvalsdeild.

== All-time award winners ==
The following is a list of the all-time Úrvalsdeild Men's Defensive Player of the Year winners.

Season	Player	Team
1983-1984	(Iceland) Torfi Magnússon	Valur
1985-1986	(Iceland) Ívar DeCarsta Webster	Haukar
2002-2003	(Iceland) Sverrir Þór Sverrisson	Keflavík
2003-2004	(Iceland) Sverrir Þór Sverrisson (2x)	Keflavík
2004-2005	(Iceland) Friðrik Stefánsson	Njarðvík
2005-2006	(Iceland) Ingvaldur Magni Hafsteinsson	Snæfell
2006-2007	(Iceland) (United States) Brenton Birmingham	Njarðvík
2007-2008	(Iceland) Hlynur Bæringsson	Snæfell
2008-2009	(Iceland) Jón Arnór Stefánsson	KR
2009-2010	(Iceland) Hlynur Bæringsson (2x)	Snæfell
2010-2011	(Iceland) Hörður Axel Vilhjálmsson	Keflavík
2011-2012	(Iceland) Guðmundur Jónsson	Þór Þorlákshöfn
2012-2013	(Iceland) Guðmundur Jónsson (2x)	Þór Þorlákshöfn
2013-2014	(Iceland) Darri Hilmarsson	KR
2014-2015	(Iceland) Darri Hilmarsson (2x)	KR
2015-2016	(Iceland) Darri Hilmarsson (3x )	KR
2016-2017	(Iceland) Hlynur Bæringsson (3x)	Stjarnan
2017-2018	(Iceland) Kristófer Acox	KR
2018-2019	(Iceland) Ægir Þór Steinarsson	Stjarnan
2020-2021	(Iceland) Hörður Axel Vilhjálmsson	Keflavík
2022-2023	(Iceland) Hjálmar Stefánsson	Valur
2023-2024	(Iceland) Sigurður Pétursson	Keflavík
2024-2025	(Iceland) Ægir Þór Steinarsson (2x)	Stjarnan
