= Rick Hockenos =

American basketball player and coach

Personal information
- Born: c.1951 United States
- Listed height: 196 cm (6 ft 5 in)

Career information
- High school: Bishop Duffy (Niagara Falls, New York)
- College: NCCC (1969–1971); Saint Francis (1972–1974)
- NBA draft: 1974: 10th round, 176th overall pick
- Drafted by: Chicago Bulls
- Playing career: 1974–1978
- Position: Guard / forward

Career history

Playing
- 1975: Israel Sabras
- 1977–1978: Valur

Coaching
- 1977–1978: Valur
- 1978–1979: Buffalo State (assistant)

Career highlights
- As player: Úrvalsdeild Player of the Year (1978)
- Stats at Basketball Reference

Richard Hockenos is an American former basketball player and coach. After being drafted by the Chicago Bulls in the 1974 NBA draft he went on to play professionally in Europe.

== Early life ==
Hockenos attended Bishop Duffy High School in Niagara Falls, New York. Between his sophomore and junior years he had a hip operation as he was growing to fast and the bones in his hip separated. After mediocre senior season, he was not recruited by any colleges and rejected by the schools he applied to due to academic reasons. He finally enrolled at Niagara Community College in 1969. After having a successful second season with NCCC basketball team, he decided to spend his last two seasons with Gannon College. His stay there turned out to be short and after a week, he left the school. A short time later, Hockenos visited St. Francis University at the behest of Pete Lonergan, a former assistant coach at NCCC. After sitting out his first semester, Hockenos played two seasons for St. Francis where he averaged 13.7 points in 41 games.

== Professional career ==
Hockenos was drafted by the Chicago Bulls in the 10th round of the 1974 NBA draft. He played through six weeks of training camp and seven exhibition games before he was released. In 1975, he played for the Israel Sabras of the short lived European Professional Basketball League.

In September 1977, Hockenos signed with Valur of the Icelandic top-tier league as a player-coach. For the season he scored 407 points in 14 games, for an average of 29.1 points per game, good for second in the league in scoring, behind Dirk Dunbar, and was named the Player of the Year.

In April 1978, he re-signed with Valur for the 1978–79 season. 10 days after he arrived back in Iceland, Hockenos unexpectedly left the club in September 1978. In his place, Valur signed Tim Dwyer.

After arriving back in the United States, Hockenos became an assistant coach at Buffalo State.

== Later life ==
In 2018, Hockenos was inducted into the Niagara Falls Sports Hall of Fame.
