= Trent Smock =

American basketball player

Personal information
- Born: August 28, 1954 (age 72)
- Listed height: 6 ft 5 in (1.96 m)
- Listed weight: 205 lb (93 kg)

Career information
- High school: Richmond (Richmond, Indiana)
- College: Indiana (1972–1974, 1976–1977)
- NBA draft: 1977: undrafted
- Position: Guard / forward

Career history

Playing
- 1979–1980: ÍS

Coaching
- 1979–1980: ÍS (women's)

Career highlights
- As player: Úrvalsdeild scoring champion (1980); As coach: Icelandic Women's Cup (1980)

Trent R. Smock (born August 28, 1954) is an American former basketball player and coach. He played basketball and football for Indiana University in the 70's and later starred in basketball in Iceland where he led the top-tier Úrvalsdeild karla in scoring in 1980.

== Basketball career ==
=== College career ===
Smock played college basketball for Indiana University under Bobby Knight from 1972 to 1974 and again during the 1976–77 season under a new, fifth-year eligibility rule. He left the team during his final season, stating that he was dismissed by Knight for questioning his role with the team.

=== Professional career ===
In January 1979, Smock signed with Úrvalsdeild karla club Íþróttafélag Stúdenta (ÍS), replacing Dirk Dunbar who had a season ending knee surgery. His transfer to ÍS became a trial case for the Icelandic Basketball Federation rules regarding foreign players as they only stipulated that teams had to announce before October 15, each season, that they intended to sign a foreign player but did not count for teams replacing players during the season. On January 31, the Federation ruled that teams were allowed to replace foreign players for medical reasons during the season. He played his first game for ÍS on February 1, scoring 29 points, with 20 of them in the first half, in an 87–101 loss against Njarðvík. For the season, he averaged 31.4 points per game in 7 games.

Smock returned to ÍS for the 1979–1980 season. On October 18, 1979, he scored 50 points in an 85–80 loss against Njarðvík. On March 15, he scored the game winning basket at the buzzer in ÍS 106–104 victory against ÍR. On February 26, 1979, he scored 44 points against Fram in the Final Eight of the Icelandic Cup. In the Final Four of the Cup, ÍS defeated KR, 85–81, with Smock scoring 38 points. In the Cup Finals, ÍS lost to newly crowned national champions Valur, 92–82. In 19 Úrvalsdeild games, he averaged league leading 34.6 points per game. He was the runner-up for the Foreign Player of the Year award, behind Tim Dwyer.

On Marc 21, 1980, Smock played an unofficial game in Laugardalshöll between American professional players in Iceland and a Soviet national team, made of Armenian players. The Americans coasted to an 87–78 victory, with Smock scoring 10 points.

=== Coaching career ===
Smock was the head coach of ÍS women's team from January 1979 to 1980, guiding them to the Icelandic Women's Basketball Cup on March 19, 1980.

== American football ==
=== College career ===
Smock played college football for Indiana University. He finished his career with 1,488 receiving yards and 15 touchdowns.

=== Professional career ===
Smock was drafted by the Detroit Lions with 419th overall pick in the 1976 NFL draft. In July 1977, he signed as a free agent for the Minnesota Vikings but did not appear in a game with the team.
