= Val Bracey =

American basketball player and coach

Personal information
- Born: October 27, 1959 (age 67) Grand Rapids, Michigan, U.S.
- Listed height: 6 ft 2 in (1.88 m)

Career information
- High school: Union (Grand Rapids, Michigan)
- College: Delta (1975–1976); Central Michigan (1976–1979)
- NBA draft: 1979: 9th round, 170th overall pick
- Drafted by: Detroit Pistons
- Position: Guard

Career history

Playing
- 1980–1983: Fram

Coaching
- 1980–1982: Fram

Career highlights
- As player: Úrvalsdeild Foreign Player of the Year (1982); Icelandic Basketball Cup (1982); 1. deild karla winner (1981); As coach: Icelandic Basketball Cup (1982); 1. deild karla winner (1981)
- Stats at Basketball Reference

Valray Bracey (Note: Bracey's last name was alternatively spelled as Bracy or Brazy in the Icelandic media.) (born October 27, 1959) is an American former professional basketball player and coach. He played college basketball for Central Michigan University and later professionally in Iceland where he was named the Úrvalsdeild Foreign Player of the Year in 1982, the same year he won the Icelandic Basketball Cup.

== Early life ==
Bracey was born and raised in Grand Rapids, Michigan, one of seven siblings.

== Playing career ==
=== College career ===
Bracey started his college career with Delta College where he averaged 17 points per game and was an All-Region junior college pick. In 1976, he transferred to Central Michigan University where he played until 1979. In 82 games for the Central Michigan Chippewas, he averaged 12.5 points while shooting 48,6% from the field.

=== Professional career ===
After graduating, Bracey was drafted by the Detroit Pistons with the 170th pick in the 9th round of the 1979 NBA draft. He was waived by the Pistons in September the same year, bringing their roster down to 15 players.

In 1980, Bracey signed with 1. deild karla club Fram as a player-coach. On 14 October, he starred in an exhibition game with a selection of American and Icelandic players, scoring 23 points in a 105–93 win against the Chinese national team.

During the summer of 1981, Bracey had a tryout with the Portland Trail Blazers but returned to Fram before the start of the 1981–82 season with Kolbeinn Kristinsson hired as his assistant coach. In September, he helped Fram to victory in the annual Reykjavík Basketball Tournament and led all scorers with 109 points. In October, Fram had agreed to loan him to Valur ahead of its games against Crystal Palace in the FIBA European Cup Winners' Cup. Shortly before Valur departed to England, Fram barred Bracey from going, citing their desire to have him get more practice time with newly signed Guðsteinn Ingimarsson. On 4 March 1982, he scored a career high 47 points in a victory against ÍR. During the season, he helped the Fram finish as the runner-up in the Úrvalsdeild karla and win the Icelandic Cup while being named the Úrvalsdeild Foreign Player of the Year.

Fram initially started with American Douglas Kintzinger during the 1982–83 season but soon signed Bracey again. His Icelandic career came to an end in May 1983 when foreign players where barred from playing in the Icelandic leagues.

== Personal life ==
Bracey's son is basketball player Austin Magnús Bracey.
