= Frank Booker (basketball, born 1964) =

American basketball player (1964–2026)

Personal information
- Born: March 22, 1964 Augusta, Georgia, U.S.
- Died: February 20, 2026 (aged 61)
- Listed height: 185 cm (6 ft 1 in)
- Listed weight: 86 kg (190 lb)

Career information
- High school: Westside (Augusta, Georgia)
- College: Bowling Green (1983–1987)
- NBA draft: 1987: 7th round, 140th overall pick
- Drafted by: New Jersey Nets
- Playing career: 1987–1995
- Position: Guard

Career history

Playing
- 1991: ÍR
- 1991–1994: Valur
- 1994–1995: Grindavík

Coaching
- 1993–1994: Valur

Career highlights
- Icelandic Basketball Cup (1995); 3× Úrvalsdeild scoring champion (1991, 1992, 1994); 4× Icelandic All-Star (1991, 1992, 1994, 1995); Icelandic All-Star MVP (1994)

Career Úrvalsdeild karla statistics
- Points: 2,577 (27.7 ppg)
- Rebounds: 553 (5.9 rpg)
- Assists: 409 (4.4 apg)
- Stats at Basketball Reference

Frank Alonzo Booker (Note: Booker's first name was alternatively spelled as Franc in the Icelandic media.) (March 22, 1964 – February 20, 2026) was an American professional basketball player. He played college basketball for Bowling Green State University and was drafted by the New Jersey Nets in the 1987 NBA draft. He gained considerable fame in Iceland as a high scoring guard in the Úrvalsdeild karla during the early 1990s. He was a three-time scoring champion in the Úrvalsdeild and four time All-Star. In 1992, he led Valur to the Úrvalsdeild finals and in 1995 he won the Icelandic Basketball Cup with Grindavík.

== College ==
Booker played college basketball at Bowling Green State University from 1983 to 1987.

== Career ==
=== NBA ===
On June 22, 1987, Booker was selected by the New Jersey Nets with the second pick in round 7 of the 1987 NBA draft. He had short pre-season stints with the Nets, Miami Heat and Cleveland Cavaliers.

=== Iceland ===
==== ÍR ====
Booker joined ÍR in January 1991, and in his first game he set a Úrvalsdeild record when he made 15 three-point shots. Two games later he tied the record when he again made 15 three-pointers, en route to 60 points, in a loss against Snæfell. For the season he averaged a league leading 43.2 points while making 7.8 three-pointers per game.

==== Valur ====
Booker joined Valur at the start of the 1991–1992 season and led them to the 1992 Úrvalsdeild finals, where the team lost to Keflavík, 2–3, after holding a 2–1 lead in the series. As a member of Valur he led the league in scoring in 1992 and 1994. In 1994 he was named the All-Star game MVP.

==== Grindavík ====
After three seasons with Valur, Booker joined Grindavík in 1994. For the season Booker averaged 15.5 points per game, leading the club to the second best record in the league, and helping it to win the 1995 Icelandic Basketball Cup.

Booker was unexpectedly let go from Grindavík after their first game in the 1995 Úrvalsdeild playoffs. The split was far from amicable. Grindavík claimed Booker had become disgruntled and disinterested after being denied by the team to participate in the All-Star game in February, due to him missing practices the same week because of a back injury. They further claimed that he had dishonored an agreement to live in an apartment the club rented for him in Grindavík, dubbed "the most expensive shoe storage this side of the Alps" by the press, and spent to much energy driving back and forth from Reykjavík where he lived with his girlfriend. Booker responded that he was deeply disappointed by the dismissal and the allegations but wished the club all the best in its upcoming games.

Grindavík stepped up after Booker's departure, dismantling Haukar in the next game, 88–122, and sweeping them out of the playoffs.

After a big loss to Keflavík in the semi-finals, allegations rose that Booker had leaked Grindavík's playbook to Keflavík. Both Booker and Keflavík's head coach, Jón Kr. Gíslason, strongly denied the allegations, with Jón Kr. stating that he had multiple game tapes of Keflavík and did not need any help in finding their tactics. To further fuel the argument between the two parties, Booker requested that the club paid him bonus for it getting to the quarter finals as was stated in his contract.

== Coaching career ==
Booker started as the head coach of Valur during the 1993–1994 season. He was replaced after a 3–10 start by Svali Björgvinsson.

== Personal life and death ==
Booker's half Icelandic son, Frank Aron Booker, played for the Oklahoma Sooners in the Big 12 Conference from 2013 to 2015. He transferred from the Florida Atlantic Owls before the 2015–16 season. Prior to his senior year, Frank Aron transferred to South Carolina for the 2017–18 season.

Booker died on February 20, 2026, at the age of 61.
