= Kristinn Albertsson =

Businessman and former basketball player and referee (born 1965)

16th Chairman of KKÍ
- Incumbent
- Assumed office 2025
- Preceded by: Guðbjörg Norðfjörð

Personal details
- Born: 8 July 1965 (age 60)
- Basketball career

Personal information
- Listed height: 188 cm (6 ft 2 in)
- Listed weight: 88 lb (40 kg)
- Position: Forward

Career history
- 1984–1985: Valur
- 1985–1990: Breiðablik

Kristinn Albertsson (born 6 July 1965) is an Icelandic businessman and former basketball player and referee. He is the current chairman of the Icelandic Basketball Federation. He played basketball with Valur and Breiðablik but then focused on refereeing and became a FIBA international referee at the age of just 22. He refereed over 400 Úrvalsdeild karla games and more than 50 games abroad under FIBA.

He was a member of the board of the Icelandic Basketball Association (KKÍ) for five years and its general manager for two years. In 2003, he was awarded the Association's highest recognition award for his contribution to basketball.

On 15 March 2025, Kristinn was voted as the 16th charmain of the Icelandic Basketball Association.
