= Atli Freyr Haraldsson Katrínarson =

Icelandic basketball player (born 2010)

No. 2 – Valur
- Position: Center
- League: Úrvalsdeild karla

Personal information
- Born: 13 April 2010 (age 16)
- Listed height: 202 cm (6 ft 8 in)

Career information
- Playing career: 2026–present

Career history
- 2026–present: Valur
Medals
Men's basketball
Representing the Iceland
FIBA U16 EuroBasket Division B
| Silver medal – second place | 2026 | Team |

Atli Freyr Haraldsson Katrínarson (born 13 April 2010) is an Icelandic basketball player for Valur of the Icelandic Úrvalsdeild karla.

== Early life ==
Atli Freyr started playing basketball with Valur's junior teams at the age of 9, with his first coach being Pálmi Ragnarsson. In February 2026, he was named the MVP of the Icelandic U-15 Cup tournament after posting 30 points, 14 rebounds, 4 assists and 5 steals in Valur's cup final victory against Stjarnan.

== Club career ==
He started his senior team career with Valur during the 2026–2027 season. In his debut, he had 18 points and 12 rebounds in a win against Stjarnan, becoming the second youngest player to achieve a double-double in the Úrvalsdeild history. On 18 October, he had 12 points and 10 rebounds in a victory against Þór Þorlákshöfn in the Icelandic Cup.

== National team career ==
=== Junior national team ===
Atli Freyr has played for Iceland's U-15 and U-16 national teams. During the 2026 FIBA U16 EuroBasket Division B, he averaged 14.5 points, 9.5 rebounds, 3.4 assists and 1.9 blocks, helping Iceland to silver and promotion to Division A. For his effort he was named to the tournament's All-Star Five.

== Awards and honors ==
=== National team ===
- FIBA U16 EuroBasket Division B silver medal winner: (2026)
- FIBA U16 EuroBasket Division B All-Star Five: (2026)
