= Hjálmar Stefánsson =

Icelandic basketball player

Valur
- Position: Forward
- League: Úrvalsdeild karla

Personal information
- Born: 5 January 1996 (age 30) Iceland
- Listed height: 200 cm (6 ft 7 in)

Career information
- Playing career: 2013–present

Career history
- 2013–2020: Haukar
- 2020–2021: CB Carbajosa
- 2021–present: Valur

Career highlights
- Úrvalsdeild Defensive Player of the Year (2023); 2× Icelandic champion (2022, 2024); 2× Icelandic Cup (2023, 2025); 2× Icelandic Super Cup (2022, 2023)
Medals
Men's basketball
Representing Iceland
Games of the Small States of Europe
Bronze medal – third place	2019 Montenegro	Team

Hjálmar Stefánsson (born 5 January 1996) is an Icelandic basketball player for Valur of the Úrvalsdeild karla and a member of the Icelandic national basketball team. In 2022, he won his first Icelandic championship. In 2023, he was named the Úrvalsdeild Defensive Player of the Year.

== Career ==
Hjálmar came up through the junior ranks of Haukar and started his senior team career during the 2013–14 season. In 2018–19, he averaged a career highs of 13.5 points and 7.5 rebounds. In August 2020, Hjálmar signed with Liga EBA club Aquimisa Carbajosa where he met fellow Icelander Tómas Þórður Hilmarsson. In February 2021, it was reported that Hjálmar would leave Carbajosa and return to Iceland to join Valur, much to the displeasure of Haukar who threatened legal action as they believed that he was still under contract obligations not to play for any other team in Iceland except them until after the season. On 27 February, the Icelandic Basketball Association confirmed his transfer from Carbajosa to Valur. On 5 March it was reported that Haukar would not pursue a legal case in the matter.

In 2022, he won the Icelandic championship with Valur.

On 2 October 2022, he won the Icelandic Super Cup with Valur. On 14 January 2023, he won the Icelandic Cup after Valur defeated Stjarnan in the Cup final.

In 2023, he was named the Úrvalsdeild Defensive Player of the Year.

On 24 September 2023, he won his second straight Icelandic Super Cup after Valur defeated Tindastóll 80–72.

On 22 March 2025, he won the Icelandic Cup for the second time, after Valur defeated KR in the Cup finals, 96–78.

== National team career ==
Hjálmar debuted for the Icelandic national team in June 2018. He was a member of the team that won silver at the 2019 Games of the Small States of Europe.
