= Bjarni Gunnar Sveinsson =

Icelandic basketball player

Personal information
- Born: 19 May 1946 (age 80) Reykjavík, Iceland
- Position: Center

Career history
- 1967–1982: ÍS
- 198?–199?: ÍS-b

Career highlights
- Icelandic Basketball Cup (1978); 2× Icelandic D1 champion (1968, 1971); Icelandic League scoring champion (1977)

Bjarni Gunnar Sveinsson (born 19 May 1946) is an Icelandic former basketball player who played 36 games for the Icelandic national team. He spent his entire career with Íþróttafélag Stúdenta where he won the Icelandic Basketball Cup in 1978.

== Early life ==
Bjarni was born in Reykjavík but moved to Vestmannaeyjar at the age of five. He started playing basketball while attending Menntaskólinn á Akureyri. In 1967 he started attending the University of Iceland and at the same time joined Íþróttafélag Stúdenta (ÍS).

== Club career ==
During the 1976–77 season, Bjarni led the Icelandic League in scoring with 404 points, for an average of 28 points per game. On 30 March 1978, he scored 11 points in ÍS 87-83 victory against Valur in the Icelandic Basketball Cup finals. He retired from the Úrvalsdeild following the 1981-82 season.

In 1988, he played two Icelandic Basketball Cup games with the ÍS-b team against Úrvalsdeild club KR. Despite being 42-years old at the time, he scored 30 points in the first game and 32 points in the second.

== National team career ==
In 1974, at the age of 27, Bjarni was selected for the Icelandic national team for the first time. From then until 1979, he played 36 games for the team.
