= Frank Booker =

Frank Booker may refer to:

- Frank Booker (basketball, born 1964) (1964–2026), American basketball player
- Frank Aron Booker (born 1994), his son, American-Icelandic basketball player
