= 1978–79 Úrvalsdeild karla =

Úrvalsdeild karla
- Duration: 14 October 1978 – 29 March 1979
- Games played: 60
- Teams: 6

Regular season
- Relegated: Þór Akureyri

Finals
- Champions: KR (7th title)
- Runners-up: Valur

Awards
- Domestic MVP: (Iceland) Jón Sigurðsson
- Foreign MVP: (United States) Tim Dwyer

Statistical leaders
Points	(United States) John Hudson	30.3

Records
- Highest scoring: Valur 143–78 Þór Akureyri (23 March 1979)

The 1978–79 Úrvalsdeild karla was the 28th season of the Úrvalsdeild karla, the top tier men's basketball league on Iceland. The season started on 14 October 1978 and ended on 29 March 1979. KR won its 7th title by posting the best record in the league. It secured the title by beating Valur, 77–75, in the last game of the season.

== Competition format ==
The participating teams first played a conventional round-robin schedule with every team playing each opponent twice "home" and twice "away" for a total of 20 games. The top team won the national championship whilst the bottom team was relegated to Division I.

== Regular season ==
Pos	Team	Pld	W	L	PF	PA	PD	Pts	Qualification or relegation
1	KR	20	15	5	1856	1645	+211	30	Champion
2	Valur	20	14	6	1792	1697	+95	28	
3	Njarðvík	20	13	7	2026	1846	+180	26	
4	ÍR	20	9	11	1775	1764	+11	18	
5	ÍS	20	6	14	1718	1833	−115	12	
6	Þór Akureyri	20	3	17	1635	2017	−382	6	Relegated

== Notable occurrences ==
- On 19 March, fights broke out during Valur's 92–79 victory against Njarðvík. A Njarðvík's official, Kristbjörn Albertsson, was tossed from the game after running onto the court to challenge the referees following Valur's Tim Dwyer elbow to Njarðvík's Árni Lársson head. After the game ended, fights broke out in the stands and spilled out to the court. Fans and Njarðvík's officials harassed the referees, ending with referee Þráinn Skúlason being hit in the head. In the aftermath, Njarðvík's coach Hilmar Hafsteinsson was suspended for 4 games while player Ted Bee received a 1-game suspension. Njarðvík was furthermore fined 20.000 ISK.
- On 23 March, Valur set a new league scoring record in its 143–78 victory against Þór Akureyri.
