= Sigurdur Helgason =

Sigurdur Helgason may refer to:

- Sigurdur Helgason (airline executive) (1921–2009)
- Sigurður Helgason (mathematician) (1927-2023), Icelandic mathematician
- Sigurður Helgason (basketball) (born 1940), Icelandic basketball player and coach
