= Tim Dwyer (basketball) =

American former basketball player and coach

Personal information
- Listed height: 198 cm (6 ft 6 in)

Career information
- High school: Monte Vista (Whittier, California, U.S.)
- College: Rio Hondo College (1972–1974); Cal State Fullerton (1974–1976)
- Position: Forward / center

Career history

Playing
- 1978–1980: Valur
- 1982–1983: Valur

Coaching
- 1978–1980: Valur
- 1979: Iceland
- 1982–1983: Valur

Career highlights
- As player: 2× Icelandic champion (1980, 1983); 2× Icelandic cup winner (1980, 1983); 3× Úrvalsdeild Foreign Player of the Year (1979, 1980, 1983); As coach: 2× Icelandic champion (1980, 1983); 2× Icelandic cup winner (1980, 1983)

Tim Dwyer is an American former basketball player and coach. During his career, he starred in Iceland where he was a three-time Úrvalsdeild Foreign Player of the Year and led Valur to both the national championship and the Icelandic Cup in 1980 and 1983.

== College career ==
Dwyer played for Monte Vista High School in Whittier, California, then junior college basketball for Rio Hondo College, where he averaged 19 points and 10 rebounds per game in his sophomore season. He then played Division I college basketball for the Cal State Fullerton Titans men's basketball team from 1974 to 1976. In 49 games, he averaged 11.0 points and 6.8 rebounds per game.

== Professional career ==
In September 1978, Dwyer joined Úrvalsdeild karla club Valur as player-coach, replacing recently departed Rick Hockenos. He debuted with the team in the annual Reykjavík Basketball Tournament where he scored 19 points in Valur's 100–84 victory against Íþróttafélag Reykjavíkur. On October 10, he guided Valur to victory in the tournament, scoring 18 points in Valur's victory against Fram.

In his Úrvalsdeild debut on 14 October, Dwyer scored 19 points in a 101–89 victory against Þór Akureyri. On 12 March 1979, Dwyer scored a season high 44 points in a victory against arch rivals KR. Valur lost out on the national title after losing to KR, 77–75, in the last game of the season. Following the season, where he averaged 27.3 points per game in 19 games, he was named the Úrvalsdeild Foreign Player of the Year.

After some uncertainty of his return due to his financial demands, Dwyer eventually resigned with Valur prior to the 1979–80 season. On 17 March 1980, he helped Valur to its first national championship after scoring 28 points in the team's 100–93 victory against defending champions KR in the last game of the season. In 20 games, he averaged 29.4 points, finishing second in scoring in the league behind Trent Smock's 34.6 points per game. In the Icelandic Cup, he helped Valur to the Cup Finals by scoring 55 points against Njarðvík in the semi-final. Valur won the hard fought game, 105–103, after Kristján Ágústsson scored the game winning basket from just inside center court with 2 seconds left of the game. On 19 March, he scored 28 points in Valur's cup finals win against ÍS. After the season he was named the foreign player of the year for the second consecutive season.

After two seasons with Valur, Dwyer signed on in France as a player-coach before returning to his home state of California.

In July 1982, Dwyer returned to Valur as a player-coach prior to the 1982–83 season which he announced would be his last. In September, he led Valur to the pre-season Reykjavík Basketball Tournament title, scoring 22 points in Valur's 84–77 victory against Fram. On 21 March 1983, he led Valur to its second national championship after scoring 16 points in Valur's 88–87 victory against second-placed Keflavík. The game had a controversial ending after the referee Sigurður Valur Halldórsson called a three second violation on Keflavík's Brad Miley as he went up for a shot where Dwyer apparently fouled him with few seconds remaining of the game. Three days later, on 24 March, Dwyer scored 9 points but fouled out in the beginning of the second half of Valur's 78–75 victory against ÍR in the Icelandic cup finals. After the season he was named the Úrvalsdeild Foreign Player of the Year for the third time in his career. For the season, he finished fourth in scoring, averaging 23.6 points per game.

== Coaching career ==
In his three seasons with Valur, he finished with a 45–15 record. In February 1979, Dwyer was hired as the head coach of the Icelandic men's national basketball team ahead of its games against Scotland and Denmark. In his 4 games with the team, he led it twice to victory.
