= Ólafur Rafnsson =

Icelandic basketball official (1963–2013)

2nd President of FIBA Europe
- In office 2010–2013
- Preceded by: George Vassilakopoulos
- Succeeded by: Cyriel Coomas

6th President of ÍSÍ
- In office 2006–2013
- Deputy: Lárus L. Blöndal
- Preceded by: Ellert Schram
- Succeeded by: Lárus L. Blöndal

13th Chairman of KKÍ
- In office 1996–2006
- Preceded by: Kolbeinn Pálsson
- Succeeded by: Hannes S. Jónsson

Personal details
- Born: 7 April 1963 Hafnarfjörður, Iceland
- Died: 19 June 2013 (aged 50) Geneva, Switzerland
- Basketball career

Career information
- Playing career: 1980–1989
- Number: 6
- Coaching career: 1991–1992

Career history

Playing
- 1983–1989: Haukar

Coaching
- 1991–1992: Haukar

Career highlights
- As a player: Icelandic champion (1988); 2× Icelandic Cup winner (1985, 1986); Icelandic Division I champion (1983); Icelandic Division II champion (1981)

Career Úrvalsdeild karla playing statistics
- Points: 1,061 (9.7 ppg)
- Games: 109

Career coaching record
- Úrvalsdeild karla: 12–14 (.462)

Ólafur Eðvarð Rafnsson (7 April 1963 – 19 June 2013) was the president of FIBA Europe from 2010 until 2013. He also served president of the Icelandic Basketball Association from 1996 until 2006 when he was voted as the president of the National Olympic and Sports Association of Iceland where he served until 2013.

== Basketball career ==
=== Club ===
Ólafur played 109 games in the Icelandic Úrvalsdeild karla from 1983 until 1989, averaging 9.7 points per game. He won the Icelandic championship with Haukar in 1988 and the Icelandic cup in 1985 and 1986.

=== National team ===
Ólafur played 7 games for the Icelandic national team between 1985 and 1986.

== Personal life ==
Ólafur is the father of Icelandic women's national basketball team players Auður Íris Ólafsdóttir and Sigrún Björg Ólafsdóttir.

== Death ==
Ólafur died, at the age of 50, during a visit to Geneva, Switzerland, where he had been attending the official opening of FIBA's new headquarters.
