= Frank Aron Booker =

American-Icelandic basketball player

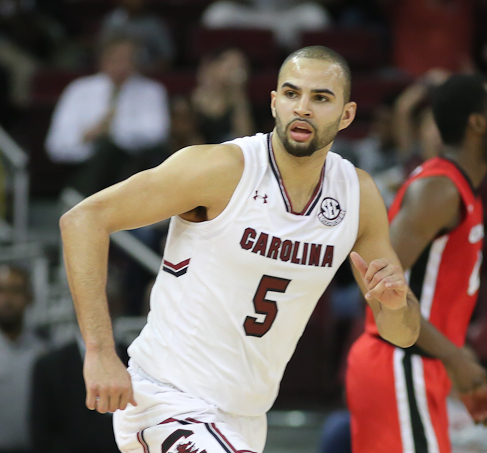

Álftanes
- Position: Shooting guard
- League: Úrvalsdeild karla

Personal information
- Born: 7 July 1994 (age 32) Reykjavík, Iceland
- Listed height: 191 cm (6 ft 3 in)
- Listed weight: 94 kg (207 lb)

Career information
- High school: Westside (Augusta, Georgia, U.S.)
- College: Oklahoma (2013–2015); Florida Atlantic (2016–2017); South Carolina (2017–2018)
- NBA draft: 2018: undrafted
- Playing career: 2018–present

Career history
- 2018–2019: ALM Évreux
- 2019–2021: Valur
- 2022: Breiðablik
- 2022–2026: Valur
- 2026–present: Álftanes

Career highlights
- Icelandic champion (2024); 2× Icelandic Cup (2023, 2025); 2× Icelandic Super Cup (2022, 2023)

Frank Aron Booker (born 7 July 1994) is an Icelandic basketball player who plays for the Úrvalsdeild karla club Álftanes. In 2019, he debuted with the Icelandic national basketball team. He played college basketball for the Oklahoma Sooners, Florida Atlantic Owls and South Carolina Gamecocks.

== Early life ==
Booker was born in Reykjavík, Iceland, to Frank Booker, an American professional basketball player who was drafted by the New Jersey Nets in 1987, and Icelander Þórunn Jónsdóttir. He grew up in Iceland until the age of 11 when he moved to his father in Augusta, Georgia to attend school. At Westside High School in Augusta, Booker averaged 27.9 points and 4.1 assists per game as a senior.

== College career ==
Booker attended the University of Oklahoma from 2013 to 2015, where he backed up Buddy Hield. On 22 May 2015, he scored 12 points in Oklahoma's victory against Dayton in the second round of the 2015 NCAA tournament. He transferred to Florida Atlantic in 2015 and redshirted his first year while undergoing a back surgery to repair a herniated disc. In 2016–2017, Booker averaged 5.7 points and 16.7 minutes per game for the Owls. Prior to his senior year, Booker transferred to South Carolina for the 2017–18 season. In 33 games for the Gamecocks, Booker averaged 12.7 points while shooting 40,9% from the three point range.

== Professional career ==
In July 2018, Booker signed with ALM Évreux of the French LNB Pro B. In 29 games for the team, he averaged 8.7 points in 21.6 minutes per game.

On 29 August 2019, Booker signed with Úrvalsdeild karla club Valur, the same team his father played for from 1991 to 1994 and led to the Úrvalsdeild Finals in 1992. After a rough debut where he scored 7 points on a dismissal 2 of 14 shooting in a narrow win against Fjölnir, Booker bounced back in his second game, scoring a team high 25 points and connecting on six of his three-point shots in a victory against Þór Þorlákshöfn. Booker averaged 15.3 points, 3.7 rebounds, 2.3 assists and 1.6 steals per game in 2019–20.

After sitting out the first half of the 2021–2022 season due to injury, Booker signed with Breiðablik in January 2022. He appeared in 10 games for Breiðablik, averaging 6.1 points and 2.6 rebounds per game.

In September 2022, Booker signed back with Valur. On 2 October 2022, he won the Icelandic Super Cup with Valur. On 14 January 2023, he won the Icelandic Cup with Valur after the team defeated Stjarnan in the Cup final.

On 24 September 2023, he won the Icelandic Super Cup again after Valur defeated Tindastóll 80–72. On 22 March, he scored 20 points in Valur's 96–78 win against KR in the Icelandic Cup finals.

On 26 April 2026, Booker broke his left patella in game two of Valur's semi-finals series against top-seeded Grindavík, forcing him to miss the rest of the playoffs.

In July 2026, Booker signed with Álftanes.

== National team career ==
Booker was invited by Icelandic national team coach Craig Pedersen to attend training camp prior to Iceland's EuroBasket 2015 qualification but could not attend due to commitments to Oklahoma. In July 2019, he was selected to Iceland's 15-man roster ahead of its games against Portugal and Switzerland in the EuroBasket 2021 qualification. He played his first game in a 1-point loss against Portugal on 8 August, scoring 2 points.
