= Vladimir Obuchov =

Soviet basketball coach (1935–2020)

Vladimir Obukhov
Personal information
- Born: 12 August 1935 Moscow, Russian SFSR, Soviet Union
- Died: 16 June 2020 (aged 84)
- Coaching career: 19??–?

Career history

Coaching
- 1972–19??: MBC Dynamo Moscow (assistant)
- 1990–1991: Valur

Career coaching record
- Úrvalsdeild karla: 9–23 (.281)
Medals
Men's basketball
Head coach for Soviet Union
FIBA EuroBasket
Gold medal – first place	1985 Germany
FIBA World Cup
Silver medal – second place	Spain 1986

Vladimir Nikolayevich Obukhov (Russian: Владимир Николаевич Обухов; 21 August 1935 – 16 July 2020) was a Soviet and Russian professional basketball coach. He was a Merited Coach of the Soviet Union and Honoured coach of Russia.

== Life and career ==
Obukhov was born in Moscow. He graduated from the Regional Pedagogical Institute in Moscow in 1959. He started his career as coach with the Soviet Union national under-18 team in 1968 and was coach of the team until 1989. In 1972 Obuchov became assistant coach at MBC Dynamo Moscow. The team twice won third place in the USSR Premier Basketball League (1975 and 1976). In 1985 Obukhov became coach of the Soviet Union men's national basketball team. With the team he won gold at EuroBasket 1985. In 1986 he won the silver medal at 1986 FIBA World Championship.

In 1990, Obuchov was hired as the head coach of Úrvalsdeild karla club Valur. He guided Valur to a 7–19 record for the 1990–91 season. He was fired on 31 October 1991, after losing 4 of the first 6 games at the start of the 1991–92 season, and replaced with Tómas Holton.

In 1992 he was coach of the Malta men's national basketball team. Obuchov died on 16 July 2020, aged 84.
