= 1982–83 Úrvalsdeild karla =

Úrvalsdeild karla
- Duration: 1 October 1982 – 21 March 1983
- Games played: 60
- Teams: 6

Regular season
- Relegated: Fram

Finals
- Champions: Valur (2nd title)
- Runners-up: Keflavík

Awards
- Domestic MVP: (Iceland) Pétur Guðmundsson
- Foreign MVP: (United States) Tim Dwyer

Statistical leaders
Points	(United States) Stew Johnson	38.2

Records
- Highest scoring: Keflavík 111–94 KR (1 October 1982); Fram 101–104 KR (15 November 1982)

The 1982–83 Úrvalsdeild karla was the 32nd season of the Úrvalsdeild karla, the top tier men's basketball league on Iceland. The season started on 1 October 1982 and ended on 21 March 1983. Valur won its second title by posting the best record in the league with a win against Keflavík in the last day of the season.

== Competition format ==
The participating teams first played a conventional round-robin schedule with every team playing each opponent twice "home" and twice "away" for a total of 20 games. The top team won the national championship whilst the bottom team was relegated to Division I.

== Regular season ==
Pos	Team	Pld	W	L	PF	PA	PD	Pts	Qualification or relegation
1	Valur	20	15	5	1799	1629	+170	30	Champion
2	Keflavík	20	14	6	1684	1664	+20	28	
3	ÍR	20	9	11	1587	1600	−13	18	
4	KR	20	8	12	1702	1778	−76	16	
5	Njarðvík	20	8	12	1640	1691	−51	16	
6	Fram	20	6	14	1705	1755	−50	12	Relegated

== Notable occurrences ==
- In November 1982, Pétur Guðmundsson returned to Iceland after playing with the Portland Trail Blazers and joined Íþróttafélag Reykjavíkur. Prior to his arrival, ÍR was last in the league, having lost all 6 games. With Pétur, the team won 9 of its last 14 games, finishing third in the league, and made it to the Cup finals where it lost to Valur, 75–78. In 14 Úrvalsdeild games, Pétur averaged 28.0 points per game.
