= Dirk Dunbar =

American basketball player and coach

Personal information
- Born: October 28, 1953 (age 73)
- Listed height: 183 cm (6 ft 0 in)

Career information
- College: Central Michigan (1972–1974); Eckerd (1976–1977)
- Position: Guard
- Number: 12

Career history

Playing
- 1977–1979: ÍS

Coaching
- 1977–1978: ÍS (women's)

Career highlights
- As player: Úrvalsdeild karla scoring champion (1978); Icelandic Cup winner (1978); As coach: Icelandic Women's champion (1978); Icelandic Women's Cup winner (1978)

Dirk Dunbar (born 28 October 1953) is an American former basketball player and coach. He was one of the first foreign players to play in Iceland where he led the Úrvalsdeild karla in scoring and won the Icelandic Cup in 1978.

== College career ==
Dunbar played basketball for Central Michigan University and was the Mid-American Conference third leading scorer as a freshman. He was plagued by injuries during his stay at Central Michigan, missing all but 11 games of his sophomore season due to two knee surgeries. He red shirted his junior year before deciding to transfer to Eckerd College in January 1976. At Eckerd, he set the schools single game and season scoring records.

== Club career ==
Dunbar signed with ÍS of the top-tier Icelandic basketball league in July 1977. His first games came during the Reykjavík Basketball Tournament where he broke the nations single game scoring record on October 8, by scoring 58 points against Fram, breaking Þórir Magnússon's previous record of 57 points. Shortly after, Dunbar sprained his ankle badly on practice and missed the rest of the tournament. He returned to the court a month later, scoring 20 points in ÍS 99–73 victory against Ármann in the top-tier 1. deild karla. ÍS finished the season tied with Valur for the 3–4th place with a 10–4 record. Dunbar led the league in scoring, with 459 points in 13 games, and free throw percent with 92.9%, both league records.

On 30 March, Dunbar lead ÍS to the Icelandic Cup, beating Valur 87–83 in the Cup finals.

Dunbar resigned with ÍS for the 1978–1979 season. On 1 October 1978, he broke his own scoring record by scoring 61 points in an overtime loss against Ármann in the Reykjavík Basketball Tournament.

On 30 October, Dunbar suffered injury on his left knee in a game against ÍR and went back to Michigan for surgery. He returned in time for ÍS games against FC Barcelona in the FIBA European Cup Winners' Cup. In January 1979, Dunbar left ÍS to undergo a season ending surgery on his troublesome knee.

After recovering from his injuries, Dunbar signed with Darmstadt in Germany in 1980.

== Coaching career ==
Dunbar coached ÍS women's team for the 1977–1978 season, leading them to victory in the nations all three major competitions, the Icelandic championship, the Icelandic Cup, and the Reykjavík Basketball Tournament.
