= Magnús Matthíasson =

Icelandic basketball player

Personal information
- Born: 25 February 1967 (age 59) Iceland
- Listed height: 205 cm (6 ft 9 in)

Career information
- College: Rice (1985–1986)
- Playing career: 1989–1995
- Position: Center

Career history
- 1989–1993: Valur

Career highlights
- Úrvalsdeild Domestic Player of the Year (1991); 2× Úrvalsdeild Domestic All-First Team (1991, 1993); Úrvalsdeild Young Player of the Year (1991); Icelandic All-Star (1991)

Career Úrvalsdeild karla statistics
- Points: 1,628 (21.1 ppg)
- Rebounds: 657 (8.5 rpg)
- Assists: 134 (1.7 apg)

Magnús Helgi Matthíasson (born 25 February 1967) is an Icelandic former basketball player and a former member of the Icelandic national team. He played college basketball for Rice University.

== Club career ==
After finishing his studies in the United States, Matthías returned to Iceland to play for Valur. He was named the Úrvalsdeild Domestic Player of the Year and the Young Player of the Year in 1991 after finishing fourth in scoring in the league. In 1992, he helped Valur reach the Úrvalsdeild finals where the team lost to Njarðvík.

== National team career ==
Magnús played 57 games for the Icelandic national team from 1987 to 1994. In his last game, he scored 11 points in a 105-100 victory against England, where the English players stormed off the court with 24 seconds left due to their unhappiness with the referees. In March 1995 he was selected to the 19-player training camp but was not among the players selected for the team.

== Personal life ==
Magnús' brother is former basketball player Matthías Matthíasson.
