= Davíð Janis =

Icelandic-Indonesian basketball player

Personal information
- Born: 4 February 1946 Sumatra, Indonesia
- Died: 12 November 2021 (aged 75) Reykjavík, Iceland
- Listed height: 175 cm (5 ft 9 in)

Career information
- College: Arizona
- Position: Guard

Career history

Playing
- 1970–1973: KR
- 1973–197?: ÍS
- 197?–1977: Fram
- 1977–197?: KR

Coaching
- 1976–1977: Fram

Davíð Janis (born Anis; 4 February 1946 – 12 November 2021) was an Icelandic and Indonesian basketball player. He became one of the first foreign basketball players to play in Iceland when he joined KR in 1970.

== Early life ==
Davíð was born and grew up on the island Sumatra in Indonesia.

== Playing career ==
Davíð played for the junior national team of Indonesia before he went to study in the University of Arizona, where he changed his name to David Janis. In 1970, he moved with his Icelandic wife to Iceland where he started playing for KR. He played for KR in the 1970–71 FIBA European Cup Winners' Cup and in 1972 he won the Reykjavík Tournament Championship with the team.

In 1973, he received Icelandic citizenship and changed the spelling of his first name to Davíð.

In the fall of 1973, Davíð transferred to ÍS and in 1974 played with the team in the Nordic Championships of Colleges that was held in Reykjavík. In 1977 he rejoined KR after playing for Fram.

== Coaching career ==
Davíð was the head coach of Fram women's team during the 1976–77 season, the lone season it participated in the Icelandic basketball tournament.

== Death ==
Davíð died in November 2021, at Landspítali in Fossvogur, Iceland.
