= 1967 Úrvalsdeild karla (basketball) =

1. deild karla^{1}
- Teams: 6

Regular season
- Relegated: ÍS

Finals
- Champions: KR (3rd title)
- Runners-up: ÍR

Statistical leaders
Points	(Iceland) Þórir Magnússon	31.1
- ^{1} The league changed its name to Úrvalsdeild karla in 1978.

The 1967 Úrvalsdeild karla was the 16th season of the top tier men's basketball league on Iceland, then known as 1. deild karla. KR won their 3rd title by beating ÍR in an extra game for the championship after the two teams ended tied for the top place in the league. ÍS got relegated after posting the worst record in the league.

Þórir Magnússon set both records in single season scoring, with 311 points in 10 games, and single game scoring with 57 points.

== Competition format ==
The participating teams played each other twice for a total of 10 games. The top team won the national championship. If two teams were tied at the top at the end of the season, they would have to play an extra game to decide the national championship.

== Regular season ==
Pos	Team	Pld	W	L	PF	PA	PD	Pts	Qualification
1	KR	10	9	1	761	472	+289	18	Extra game for championship
2	ÍR	10	9	1	647	521	+126	18	Extra game for championship
3	KFR	10	5	5	671	674	−3	10	
4	Ármann	10	3	7	503	548	−45	6	
5	ÍKF	10	3	7	524	653	−129	6	
6	ÍS	10	1	9	496	734	−238	2	Relegated

== Extra game ==
Championship
KR	72
ÍR	43
