= Hörður Axel Vilhjálmsson =

Icelandic basketball player

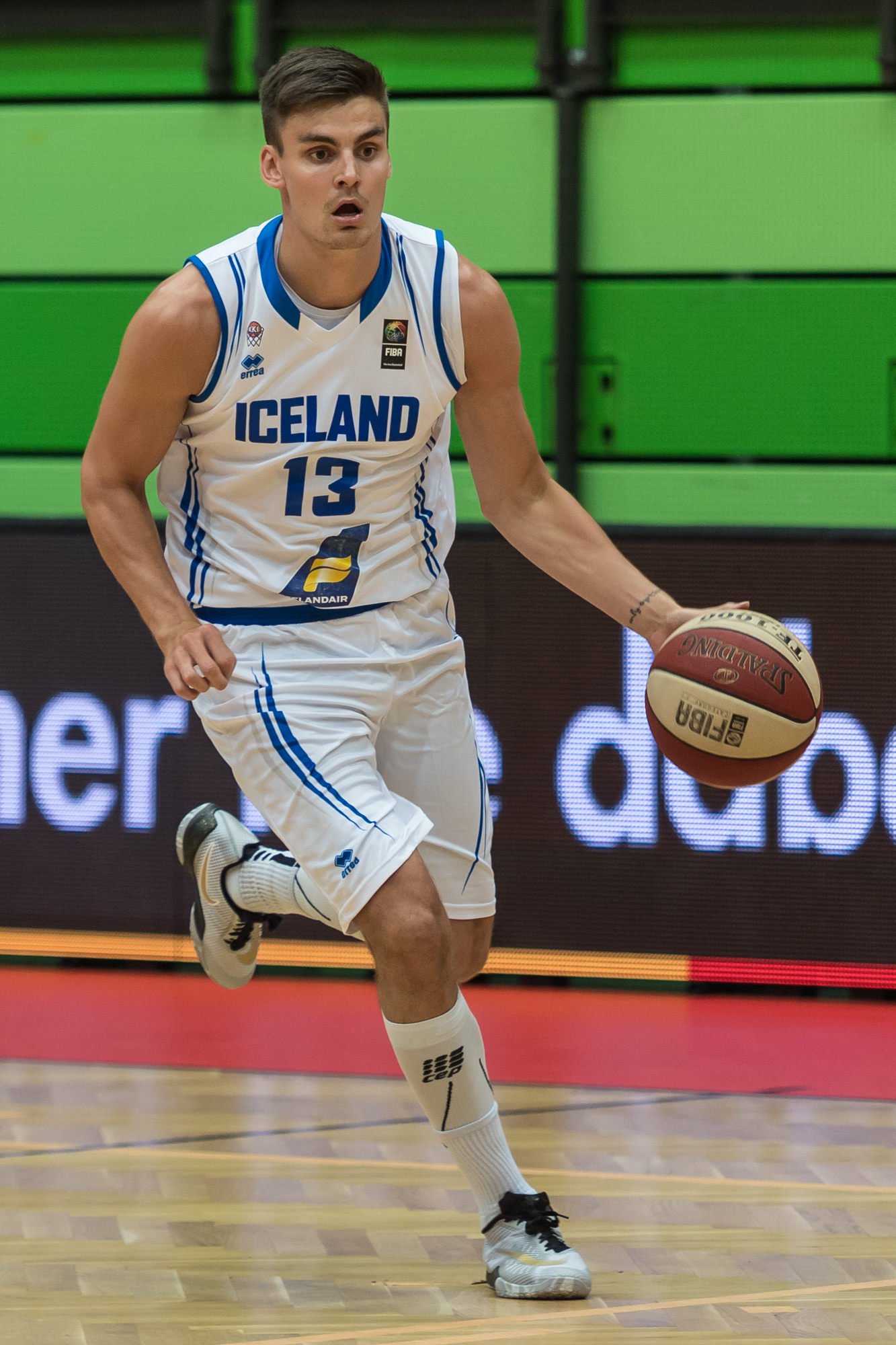
- Hörður Axel playing for the Iceland in 2015

Personal information
- Born: 18 December 1988 (age 37) Reykjavík, Iceland
- Listed height: 194 cm (6 ft 4 in)
- Listed weight: 90 kg (198 lb)

Career information
- Playing career: 2003–2025
- Position: Point guard

Career history

Playing
- 2003–2007: Fjölnir
- 2007: Gran Canaria
- 2007–2008: Njarðvík
- 2008: Club Melilla
- 2008–2011: Keflavík
- 2011–2013: Mitteldeutscher BC
- 2013–2014: Valladolid
- 2014–2015: Mitteldeutscher BC
- 2015: Aries Trikala
- 2015–2016: ČEZ Nymburk
- 2016: Aries Trikala
- 2016: Keflavík
- 2016: Limburg United
- 2016–2017: Keflavík
- 2017: Bondi Ferrara
- 2017: Astana
- 2017–2023: Keflavík
- 2018: Kymis
- 2023–2025: Álftanes

Coaching
- 2019–2022: Keflavík (assistant)
- 2022–2023: Keflavík
- 2025–2026: Keflavík

Career highlights
- As player: ProA champion (2012); Icelandic Supercup winner (2008); Úrvalsdeild Domestic Player of the Year (2021); 3× Úrvalsdeild Domestic All-First Team (2010, 2011, 2021); 2× Úrvalsdeild Defensive Player of the Year (2011, 2021); Úrvalsdeild Young Player of the Year (2006); 4× Úrvalsdeild assist leader (2017, 2020–2022); Úrvalsdeild all-time career assists leader
Medals
Men's basketball
Representing Iceland
Games of the Small States of Europe
Bronze medal – third place	2013 Cyprus	Team

Hörður Axel Vilhjálmsson (born 18 December 1988) is an Icelandic basketball coach and former player. He is the Úrvalsdeild karla all-time leader in assists.

== Professional career ==
Hörður began his senior team career at the age of 15 with Fjölnir Reykjavík. At 17, he moved to Spain to play for Gran Canaria, but returned shortly later to Iceland and joined Njarðvík. He started the 2008–2009 season with Club Melilla but returned to Iceland again and finished the season Úrvalsdeild club Keflavík. In 2009 he set the Úrvalsdeild record for most minutes played in a single game when he played all 60 minutes in a quadruple overtime game against KR. In 2010/11 he appeared in 30 games averaging 33 minutes on the floor and delivered an average of 16.5 points. With 7.3 assists, he was the third-best assist provider and he also had 2.5 steals per game being the second best player in the league in this category.

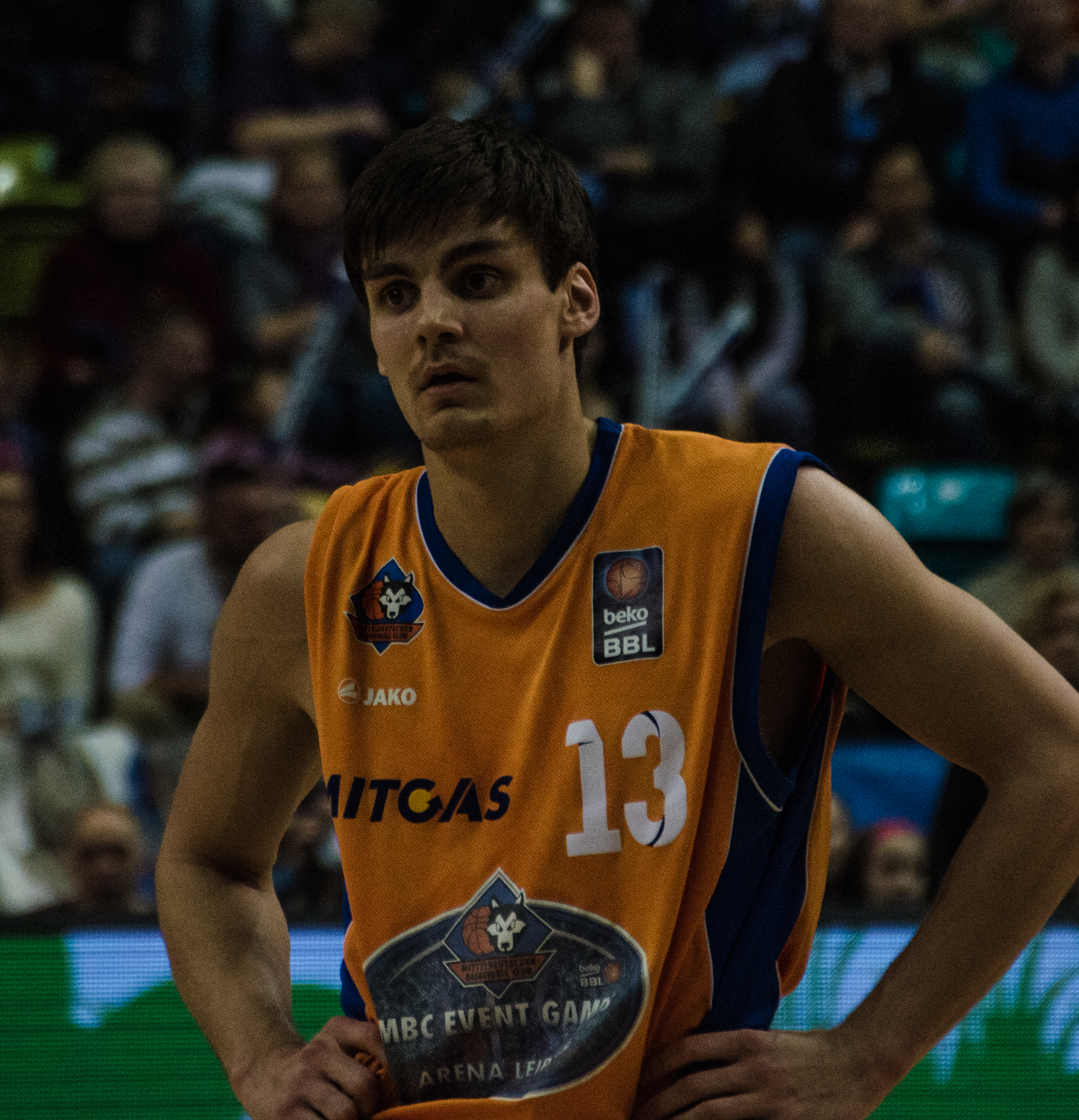
Hörður Axel in action with Mitteldeutscher BC.

In 2011 Hörður signed Mitteldeutscher BC. He received a three-year contract, which was valid in both the ProA and in the Basketball Bundesliga. In 37 games, he averaged 23 minutes on the floor and gave off 9.6 points and 2.3 assists. Mitteldeutscher BC reserved the right in the contract, to terminate the cooperation. On 17 June 2013 it was announced that Hörður made use of the option to buy out of his existing contract for a four-figure sum. This made the club as well as fans of incomprehension and disappointment as was counted on him.

Due to the Eurobasket 2013 and the related absence of some players in the Spanish first division, Hörður played with Bilbao Basket for the preseason. After preparation of completed time he moved within the league to CB Valladolid. During the season he switched back to Mitteldeutscher BC. On 3 June 2014, the club announced signed Hörður again.

On 18 August 2015 he signed with Aries Trikala of the Greek Basket League. In October, he left the club and signed with ČEZ Nymburk. On 6 January 2016, he rejoined Aries Trikala for the rest of the season.

On 1 July 2016, he joined Rethymno Cretan Kings. After Antonis Constantinides became the head coach of the club, Hörður left the club before appearing in a single game. The 2016–17 season he started with Keflavík but after only two games he left the club, and on 21 October 2016 he signed with Belgian club Limburg United. He left Limburg after appearing in five games, and returned to Keflavík. On 12 April 2017, the day after being eliminated with Keflavík from the Icelandic semi-finals, he signed with Bondi Ferrara of the Italian Serie A2 Basket.

On 5 July 2017 he signed with Astana of the VTB United League. In December 2017, Hörður left the club and expected to sign back with Keflavík. On 27 December Hörður signed with Keflavík for the rest of the 2017–18 season.

On 29 March 2018, after Keflavík had been eliminated from the Úrvalsdeild playoffs, Hörður signed with Kymis of the Greek Basket League.

In July 2018, Hörður signed with Keflavík once again. Following the 2020–21 season he was named the Úrvalsdeild Domestic Player of the Year and the Defensive Player of the Year. Following the 2022–23 season, he left the club.

In May 2023, Hörður signed with newly promoted Álftanes. On 5 January 2024, he became the Úrvalsdeild's all-time leader in assists, breaking Justin Shouse's record of 1,486 assist, after handing out 4 assists in Álftanes 80–68 win against reigning national champions Tindastóll. Following Álftanes semi-finals loss against Tindastóll in the 2025 playoffs, Hörður announced his retirement from playing.

== National team career ==
Hörður was a part of the first Icelandic national basketball team to qualify for a EuroBasket tournament, in 2015. He also played at EuroBasket 2015 with Iceland, where he averaged 6.8 points and 2.2 assists per game.

== Coaching career ==
On 8 May 2019, Hörður was announced as an assistant coach to the Keflavík women's team. In May 2022, he was hired as the head coach of Keflavík women's team. After leading the team to the best record in the league and to the Úrvalsdeild finals, were the team lost to Valur, Hörður resigned as head coach.

In May 2025, he returned as head coach for Keflavík's women's team.

== Titles, awards and achievements ==
=== Germany ===
==== Titles ====
- ProA champion: 2012

=== Iceland ===
==== Titles ====
- Icelandic Champion: 2010
- Icelandic Super Cup: 2008

==== Awards ====
- Úrvalsdeild Defense Player of the Year: 2011
- Úrvalsdeild Young Player of the Year: 2006
- Úrvalsdeild Domestic All-First Team: 2010, 2011

==== Achievements ====
- Úrvalsdeild assist leader: 2017, 2020, 2021, 2022
