= 1966 Úrvalsdeild karla (basketball) =

15th season of top tier men's basketball league of Iceland

1. deild karla^{1}
- Games played: 20
- Teams: 5

Regular season
- Relegated: ÍKF

Finals
- Champions: KR (2nd title)
- Runners-up: ÍR

Records
- Winning streak: 8 KR
- Losing streak: 8 ÍKF
- ^{1} The league changed its name to Úrvalsdeild karla in 1978.

The 1966 Úrvalsdeild karla was the 15th season of the top tier men's basketball league on Iceland, then known as 1. deild karla. KR won their 2nd title by posting the best record in the league. ÍKF got relegated after posting the worst record in the league.

Einar Bollason led the league in total scoring with 210 points.

== Competition format ==
The participating teams played each other twice for a total of 10 games. The top team won the national championship. If two teams were tied at the top at the end of the season, they would have to play an extra game to decide the national championship.

== Regular season ==
Pos	Team	Pld	W	L	PF	PA	PD	Pts	Qualification
1	KR	8	8	0	698	459	+239	16	Champion
2	ÍR	8	5	3	566	517	+49	10	
3	Ármann	8	5	3	526	550	−24	10	
4	KFR	8	2	6	613	679	−66	4	
5	ÍKF	8	0	8	405	603	−198	0	Relegated

Source: kki.is

== Scoring leaders ==
Rank	Player	Games	Points	Average
1.	(Iceland) Einar Bollason	8	210	26.3
2.	(Iceland) Þórir Magnússon		178	
3.	(Iceland) Einar Matthíasson		169	
4.	(Iceland) Hólmsteinn Sigurðsson		153	
5.	(Iceland) Birgir Örn Birgis		151	

Source: Íþróttablaðið
