= Ricky Moore (basketball) =

American basketball player and coach (born 1976)

North Carolina A&T Aggies
- Title: Assistant coach
- League: Coastal Athletic Association

Personal information
- Born: April 10, 1976 (age 50) Augusta, Georgia, U.S.
- Listed height: 6 ft 2 in (1.88 m)
- Listed weight: 185 lb (84 kg)

Career information
- High school: Westside (Augusta, Georgia)
- College: UConn (1995–1999)
- NBA draft: 1999: undrafted
- Playing career: 1999–2010
- Position: Point guard / shooting guard
- Number: 21
- Coaching career: 2010–present

Career history

Playing
- 1999–2000: Connecticut Pride
- 2000–2001: DJK Würzburg
- 2001–2002: Roanoke Dazzle
- 2002: Sioux Falls Skyforce
- 2002: Brevard Blue Ducks
- 2002–2003: Besiktas
- 2003: Sioux Falls Skyforce
- 2003–2004: WBC Wels
- 2005–2006: Chimik Južnyj
- 2007: Södertälje
- 2008–2010: WBC Wels

Coaching
- 2010–2012: Dartmouth (assistant)
- 2012–2013: UConn (admin. asst.)
- 2013–2018: UConn (assistant)
- 2021–2023: Northwest Cabarrus HS
- 2023–present: North Carolina A&T (assistant)

Career highlights
- As player: ÖBL Finals MVP (2009); NCAA champion (1999); Fourth-team Parade All-American (1995); As assistant coach: NCAA champion (2014)

Ricky S. Moore (born April 10, 1976) is an American former basketball player and current coach. He previously served as an assistant at the University of Connecticut (UConn). He played professionally for eleven years.

Moore came to UConn after an All-American high school career at Westside High School in Augusta, Georgia. He was a three-time co-captain for the Huskies, including the school's first national championship team in 1998–99. That year, Moore averaged 6.8 points and 3.6 assists per game. In the 1999 National Championship game, Moore's defense on Duke's William Avery, and his ability to guard Trajan Langdon in the final seconds, was seen as one of the keys to the Huskies defeat of the heavily favored Blue Devils and Moore was named to the All-Final Four team.

After graduation, Moore played professionally in the United States, Austria, Ukraine, Sweden, Turkey, and Germany over eleven seasons.

In 2010, Moore retired as a player and joined the coaching staff at Dartmouth College as an assistant. In 2012, he left for an opening as an administrative assistant at his alma mater, UConn, working for fellow Husky alum Kevin Ollie. In 2013, he was promoted to a full assistant role and helped lead the Huskies to the 2013–14 National Championship. Moore stayed at UConn until 2018, when head coach Ollie was dismissed because of an NCAA investigation.

He then coached in AAU. In June 2021, Moore was named head boys' basketball coach at Northwest Cabarrus High School in Kannapolis, North Carolina.
