= Ólafur Þór Thorlacius =

Icelandic multi-sport athlete (born 1936)

Personal information
- Born: 21 October 1936 (age 90) Reykjavík, Iceland
- Listed height: 184 cm (6 ft 0 in)

Career information
- Playing career: 1952–1971

Career history

Playing
- 1952–1957: Gosi
- 1957–1970: KFR
- 1970–1971: Valur

Coaching
- 1962–1963: KR
- 1970–1974: Valur
- 1972–1973: Iceland
- 1978–1979: Valur (assistant)

Ólafur Þór Thorlacius (born 21 October 1936) is an Icelandic former multi-sport athlete. He played several seasons in the Icelandic basketball and handball tournaments and was a member of the Icelandic national basketball team.

== Basketball ==
=== Club career ===
Ólafur started his career with Gosi in the 1950s. In 1963, he was in the unusual position of being the coach of KR while playing for KFR. On 26 February 1963, he scored 21 points for KFR in a 66–52 victory against KR. In December 1965, he helped the team win the Reykjavík Basketball Tournament. He retired from playing following the 1971 season.

=== National team career ===
From 1959 to 1966, Ólafur played 16 games for the Icelandic national basketball team. He was a member of Iceland's first national team on 16 May 1959, where he scored 6 points in a 38–41 loss against Denmark.

=== Coaching career ===
Ólafur was the head coach of KR from 1962 to 1963. He later coached Valur and the Icelandic men's national basketball team .

== Handball ==
Ólafur played handball for several years. In 1955, when he was a member of Fram, he was selected to an All-Star game where a team selected by the Icelandic media faced off against a team consisting of members of the Icelandic national handball team. Ólafur played 107 games with Fimleikafélag Hafnarfjarðar and won seven national championships with the team.
