= Bogi Þorsteinsson =

1st Chairman of KKÍ
- In office 29 January 1961 – 1 November 1969
- Succeeded by: Hólmsteinn Sigurðsson

1st Chairman of ÍKF
- In office 1951–1969

Chairman of Ungmennafélag Njarðvíkur
- In office 1970–1978

Personal details
- Born: 2 August 1918
- Died: 17 December 1998 (aged 80)
- Awards: Knight's Cross of the Order of the Falcon

Bogi Þorsteinsson (2 August 1918 – 17 December 1998) was the first chairman of the Icelandic Basketball Association, serving for eight years. For his work toward basketball in Iceland he was awarded the Knight's Cross of the Order of the Falcon.

== Early life ==
Bogi graduated as a radio operator in 1941. On 21 February 1945 he survived the sinking of SS Dettifoss by German submarine U-1064 in the Irish Sea. Off the 45 crew and passengers on board, 3 passengers and 12 crew members perished.
