= Bárður Eyþórsson =

Icelandic basketball coach and player (born 1968)

Personal information
- Born: 10 January 1968 (age 58) Stykkishólmur, Iceland
- Listed height: 182 cm (6 ft 0 in)

Career information
- Playing career: 1986–2000
- Coaching career: 2002–2014

Career history

Playing
- 1986–1989: Valur
- 1989–1994: Snæfell
- 1994–1995: Valur
- 1995–2000: Snæfell

Coaching
- 2002–2006: Snæfell
- 2006: ÍR
- 2007–2010: Fjölnir
- 2011–2014: Tindastóll

Career highlights
- As player: 2× 1. deild karla (1990, 1998); As coach: 2× Úrvalsdeild Coach of the Year (2004, 2006); Division I Coach of the Year (2009); Icelandic Company Cup (2004); 1. deild karla (2014)

Career Úrvalsdeild karla playing statistics
- Points: 2,797 (14.6 ppg)
- Games: 191

Career coaching record
- Úrvalsdeild karla: 87–106 (.451)

Bárður Eyþórsson (born 10 January 1968) is an Icelandic former basketball coach and player. He was twice named the coach of the year of the men's Úrvalsdeild, in the 2003–04 season and in the 2005–06 season, when he coached the Snæfell.

== Playing career ==
=== Club career ===
Bárður came up through the junior ranks of Snæfell but moved to Valur at the age of sixteen and played his first senior match in 1986. He played 191 games in the Úrvalsdeild karla from 1986 to 2000 and averaged 14.6 points per game.

=== National team ===
Bárður played three games for the Icelandic national basketball team from 1991 to 1992.

== Coaching career ==
Bárður was hired as the head coach of Snæfell men's team in 2000. He guided the club to promotion from Division I to the Úrvalsdeild karla in 2002 and to the Icelandic Basketball Cup finals in 2003, where it lost to Keflavík.

He served as the head coach of ÍR from April 2006 to November that same year, when he resigned for personal reasons.

In 2007 he took over as head coach of Fjölnir. In 2009 he guided them to a promotion to the Úrvalsdeild For his work he was named Division I coach of the year. and served there until his resignation in 2010.

In 2011, Bárður was hired as Tindastóll head coach after Borce Ilievski resigned. He guided the team to the Icelandic Basketball Cup finals in February 2012. On 24 November 2012 he guided the club to victory in the Icelandic Company Cup. Bárður last coached Tindastóll during the 2013–2014 season where he guided them to the Division I championship and promotion to Úrvalsdeild karla.
