= Hannes S. Jónsson =

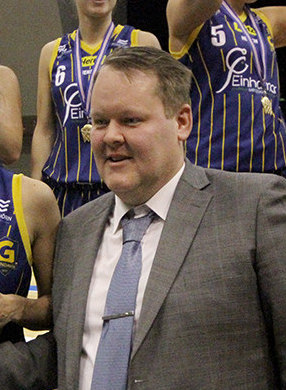

14th Chairman of KKÍ
- In office 2006–2023
- Deputy: Guðbjörg Norðfjörð
- Preceded by: Ólafur Rafnsson
- Succeeded by: Guðbjörg Norðfjörð

Vice-President of FIBA Europe
- Incumbent
- Assumed office 2023

Personal details
- Born: 25 April 1975 (age 50)

Hannes Sigurbjörn Jónsson (born 25 April 1975) is the former chairman and current CEO of the Icelandic Basketball Association and Vice-President of FIBA Europe.

== History ==
=== Icelandic Basketball Association ===
Hannes joined the board of the Icelandic Basketball Association in 1999. In 2001 he was voted the vice chairman and in 2006 he was voted as the chairman. In March 2023, he stepped down as chairman but remained as executive director of the Association.

=== FIBA Europe ===
Hannes was voted into the board of FIBA Europe in 2014 and again in 2023.
