= Svali Björgvinsson =

Icelandic businessman, sportscaster and basketball player

Personal information
- Born: 24 May 1967 (age 59)

Career information
- High school: Nelson
- Playing career: 1984–1994
- Position: Guard
- Coaching career: 1992–1999

Career history

Playing
- 1984–1985: Valur
- 1986–1993: Valur
- 1993–1994: ÍS

Coaching
- 1992–1993: Valur (men's)
- 1994: Valur (men's)
- 1994–1995: Valur (women's)
- 1995: Iceland (women's)
- 1996–1997: KR (women's)
- 1997–1999: Valur (men's)
Medals
Head coach for Iceland
women's national basketball team
Games of the Small States of Europe
Silver medal – second place	1995 Luxembourg	Team

Svali Hrannar Björgvinsson (born 24 May 1967) is an Icelandic business man, sportscaster and former basketball player.

== Basketball career ==
=== Club career ===
Svali played his first senior game with Valur in the Úrvalsdeild karla during the 1984–1985 season. He spent the following season with Nelson High School in the United States before returning to Valur in 1986. He played 99 games for Valur in the Úrvalsdeild before retiring.

=== National team career ===
Svali played two games for the Icelandic men's national basketball team in 1990.

== Coaching career ==
Svali coached Valur men's team for several seasons in Úrvalsdeild karla while also coaching Valur women's team and KR women's team for one season each in Úrvalsdeild kvenna.

He was the head coach of the Icelandic women's national basketball team during the 1995 Games of the Small States of Europe in Luxembourg.

== Broadcasting career ==
Svali works as a play-by-play broadcaster of Úrvalsdeild karla games at Stöð 2 Sport and is well known for his lively phrases.

== Outside of basketball ==
Svali worked at Kaupþing from 2003 until 2009 when he joined Icelandair. In 2018, he joined Sjóvá.
