= Flosi Sigurðsson =

Icelandic basketball player

Personal information
- Born: 10 December 1960 (age 65) Reykjavík, Iceland
- Listed height: 212 cm (6 ft 11 in)

Career information
- High school: Capital (Olympia, Washington)
- College: Washington (1981–1985)
- Position: Center

Career history
- 1977–1979: Fram

Career highlights
- Icelandic D1 champion (1979)

Flosi Sigurðsson (born 10 December 1960) is an Icelandic former basketball player and a former member of the Icelandic national team. He played college basketball for the University of Washington.

== Basketball ==
Flosi started his senior team career with Fram where he played until he went to the United States to study at Capital High School in 1979. After graduating, he received offers from several prominent colleges, and eventually chose the University of Washington.

=== National team career ===
Flosi debuted with the Icelandic national team in March 1980, scoring 7 points against Armenia. In total, he played 15 games for Iceland.

== Personal life ==
Flosi is the son of Erla Flosadóttir and former Icelandic national team player Sigurður Helgason.
