= Einar Ólafsson (basketball) =

Icelandic basketball coach (1928–2024)

Personal information
- Born: 13 January 1928 Reykjavík, Iceland
- Died: 12 March 2024 (aged 96) Reykjavík, Iceland

Career history

Playing
- 195?–19??: ÍR

Coaching
- 1959–1964: ÍR (women's)
- 196?–19??: ÍR (men's)
- 19??–1975: ÍR (women's)
- 1979–1980: ÍR (men's)
- 1980–1981: ÍR (women's)
- 1983: Iceland (assistant)
- 1993–1994: ÍR (women's)

Einar Ólafsson (13 January 1928 – 12 March 2024) was an Icelandic basketball player and coach. Called "the father of basketball", he was one of the main pioneers of modern basketball in Iceland and was one of the inaugural members of Íþróttafélag Reykjavíkur's basketball department. He played for ÍR in the 1950s before turning to coaching. He coached at ÍR for almost 50 years, including its men's and women's senior teams, winning several national championships.

== Personal life ==
Einar was married to Guðfinna Kristín Kristjánsdóttir with whom he had three sons.

Einar died at a nursing home in Reykjavík on 12 March 2024, aged 96.
