= Helgi Jóhannsson =

Icelandic basketball coach and player

Personal information
- Born: 23 June 1929 Kingdom of Iceland
- Died: 4 April 2003 (aged 73) Reykjavík, Iceland

Career history

Playing
- 1951–196?: ÍR

Coaching
- 1952–196?: ÍR (M)
- 19??–19??: ÍR (W)
- 1961–1967: Iceland (M)
- 1970: Iceland (M)
- 1978: Iceland (M)
- 1992–1993: ÍR (W)

Career highlights
- As coach: 8× Icelandic men's champion (1954, 1955, 1957, 1960–1964)

Helgi Jóhannsson (23 June 1929 – 4 April 2003) was an Icelandic basketball coach and player. He was one of the main pioneers of modern basketball in Iceland and was a founding member of Íþróttafélag Reykjavíkur's basketball department. As a coach, Helgi won a record 8 men's national championships from 1954 to 1964. He played with ÍR in the 1964–65 FIBA European Champions Cup (now called EuroLeague), the first time an Icelandic team competed in a continental competition. He was the head coach of the Icelandic men's national basketball team on three occasions, from 1961–1967, in 1970 and in 1978.

In 1963 he was the head coach of the first Icelandic junior national basketball team when he coached the Iceland men's national under-18 basketball team during the 1964 FIBA Europe Under-18 Championship qualification.

== Death ==
Helgi died on 4 April 2003 after battling cancer.
