= Ingi Þór Steinþórsson =

Icelandic basketball coach (born 1972)

KFG
- Position: Head coach
- League: 1. deild karla

Personal information
- Born: 9 May 1972 (age 54) Iceland
- Coaching career: 1998–present

Career history

Coaching
- 1998-1999: KR (Men's, assistant)
- 1999–2004: KR (Men's)
- 2008-2009: KR (Men's, assistant)
- 2009–2018: Snæfell (Men's)
- 2009–2018: Snæfell (Women's)
- 2018-2020: KR (Men's)
- 2020-present: Stjarnan (Men's, assistant)
- 202?-present: KFG (Men's)

Career highlights
- As coach: Úrvalsdeild karla Coach of the Year (2010); 3x Úrvalsdeild kvenna Coach of the Year (2014–2016); 3x Icelandic men's champion (2000, 2010, 2019); 3x Icelandic women's champion (2014–2016); Icelandic Men's Basketball Cup (2010); Icelandic Women's Basketball Cup (2016); As assistant coach: 2x Icelandic Men's champion (2009, 2025); Icelandic Men's Basketball Cup (2022); Icelandic Men's Company Cup (2008); Icelandic Men's Super Cup (2020)

Ingi Þór Steinþórsson (born 9 May 1972) is an Icelandic basketball coach. As head coach, Ingi Þór has won the Icelandic men's national championship and the women's national championship three times each. He was named Úrvalsdeild karla Coach of the Year in 2010, when he won the Úrvalsdeild karla title with the Snæfell while also being named Úrvalsdeild kvenna Coach of the Year three times, in 2014–2016, when he led Snæfell women's team to a three-peat.

Ingi Þór served as an assistant coach at KR from 1998 to 1999 and 2008–2009, helping the club win the national championship in 2009.

On 12 June 2018 he was introduced as the next head coach of the reigning men's national champions, KR, replacing Finnur Freyr Stefánsson. On 4 May 2019, he won his third Úrvalsdeild karla championship when KR beat ÍR 3–2 in the finals. He led KR to a 14–7 record during the 2019–20 season before the last game and the playoffs were canceled due to the coronavirus pandemic in Iceland. In May 2020, he was fired from his post. Less than two weeks later, he was hired as an assistant coach to Stjarnan.

On 19 March 2022, he won the Icelandic Basketball Cup when Stjarnan defeated reigning national champions Þór Þorlákshöfn in the 2022 Cup Finals.

== Awards, titles and accomplishments ==
=== Awards ===
- Úrvalsdeild karla Coach of the Year: 2010
- Úrvalsdeild kvenna Coach of the Year (3): 2014, 2015, 2016

=== Men's titles ===
- Icelandic men's champions (4): 2000, 2009^{1}, 2010, 2019
- Icelandic Basketball Cup: 2010
- Icelandic Supercup (3): 2010
- Icelandic Company Cup (2): 2008^{1}, 2010

^{1} As assistant coach

=== Women's titles ===
- Icelandic women's champions (3): 2014, 2015, 2016
- Icelandic Basketball Cup: 2016
- Icelandic Supercup (4): 2012, 2014, 2015, 2016
- Icelandic Company Cup: 2012
