= Sigurður Helgason (basketball) =

Icelandic basketball player and coach

Personal information
- Born: 29 April 1940 (age 86) Reykjavík, Iceland
- Listed height: 208 cm (6 ft 10 in)
- Position: Center

Career history
- 195?–1970: KFR
- 1970–1971: Valur

Sigurður Már Helgason (born 29 April 1940) is an Icelandic former basketball player and businessman. He played several seasons in the Icelandic Basketball Tournament and was a member of the Icelandic national basketball team.

== Club career ==
Sigurður starred for Körfuknattleiksfélag Reykjavíkur (KFR) for more than a decade. On 17 March 1962, he scored 30 points in a victory against KR. In the fall of 1965, he helped KR win the annual Reykjavík City Tournament, which at the time was the second most important basketball competition in the country. In 1970, the club merged into Knattspyrnufélagið Valur and became its basketball department. Sigurður continued to play for the team under the new name, but decided to retire at the end of the 1971 season, citing his age and negative writings in certain newspapers towards him and other players.

== National team career ==
Sigurður debuted with the Icelandic national basketball team in 1969. In total, he played 5 games for the team.

== Personal life ==
Outside of basketball, Sigurður became a master in upholstery in 1966. In 1970 he designed the Fuzzy chair.

Sigurður's son, Flosi Sigurðsson, played college basketball for the University of Washington from 1981 to 1985. A 212 cm center, he played 15 games for the Icelandic national team from 1983 to 1984.
