= Alþýðublaðið =

Defunct Icelandic newspaper

- Type: Daily newspaper
- Founded: 1919
- Ceased publication: 1998
- Language: Icelandic
- Country: Iceland
- ISSN: 1021-8203
- Free online archives: timarit.is

Alþýðublaðið (Anglicised to Althydubladid) was a newspaper of the Social Democratic Party (Iceland). It was published between 29 October 1919 and 2 October 1998. The paper was originally published six times a week, but ceased as a daily paper on 1 August 1997. Its last edition came out on 2 October 1998.
