= Westside High School (Augusta, Georgia) =

Public high school in Augusta, Georgia, United States

Location
- 1002 Patriots Way; Augusta, Georgia 30907; United States; 33°31′03″N 82°02′56″W

Information
- Type: Public
- School board: Richmond County Board of Education
- School district: Richmond County School System
- Superintendent: Malinda Cobb
- Principal: Kristi Wise
- Assistant principal: Ameesah Hatch; Jody Grant; Katrena Taylor-Springs; Amanda Hubbard
- Teaching staff: 81.90 (FTE)
- Grades: 9–12
- Enrollment: 1,020 (2023–2024)
- Student to teacher ratio: 12.45
- Campus: Suburban
- Colors: Blue, red, and white
- Mascot: "Pat" The Patriot
- Team name: Patriots
- Yearbook: The Blueprint formerly The Heritage
- Website: westside.rcboe.org

Westside High School is a public high school located in the West Augusta area of Augusta, Georgia, United States. It is operated by the Richmond County School System. Its current principal is Kristi Wise.

== Student activities ==
=== Athletics ===
GHSA region titles
Year	Region
1977	4AAA
1978	4AAAA
1979	4AAAA
1982	4AAAA
1983	4AAAA
1986	2AAA
2000	3AAA

Sports teams include basketball, baseball, wrestling, soccer, football, flag football, track & field, swimming, cross country, golf, tennis, and volleyball. The mascot of the school is "Pat" the Patriot.

Football records
288 – 266 – 7 (0.520)
The coaches and their records:

2022 Hutto, Lee 2-8-0 0.200
2021 Hutto, Lee 9-3-0 0.750
2020 Wiley, Jon 6-5-0 0.545
2019 Wiley, Jon 3-7-0 0.300
2018 Tate, Scott 1-9-0 0.100
2017 Tate, Scott 1-9-0 0.100
2016 Tate, Scott 1-9-0 0.100
2015 Tate, Scott 4-8-0 0.333
2014 Tate, Scott 4-6-1 0.409
2013 Hibbitts, Steve 6-6-0 0.500
2012 Hibbitts, Steve 5-8-0 0.385
2011 Hibbitts, Steve 4-6-0 0.400
2010 Hibbitts, Steve 1-9-0 0.100
2009 Davis, Robert? 4-6-0 0.400
2008 Barnes, Gerald 3-7-0 0.300
2007 Barnes, Gerald 5-5-0 0.500
2006 Barnes, Gerald 7-3-0 0.700
2005 Barnes, Gerald 6-5-0 0.545
2004 Barnes, Gerald 5-5-0 0.500
2003 Barnes, Gerald 4-7-0 0.364
2002 Barnes, Gerald 9-3-0 0.750
2001 Barnes, Gerald 9-2-0 0.818
2000 Barnes, Gerald 6-5-0 0.545
1999 Barnes, Gerald 4-6-0 0.400
1998 Barnes, Gerald 4-6-0 0.400
1997 Barnes, Gerald 4-6-0 0.400
1996 Fendley, Don 4-6-0 0.400
1995 Fendley, Don 4-6-0 0.400
1994 Fendley, Don 7-4-0 0.636
1993 Fendley, Don 3-7-0 0.300
1992 Fendley, Don 2-8-0 0.200
1991 Fendley, Don 7-4-0 0.636
1990 Fendley, Don 7-3-0 0.700
1989 Fendley, Don 7-5-0 0.583
1988 Fendley, Don 10-2-0 0.833
1987 Fendley, Don 5-5-0 0.500
1986 Fendley, Don 10-3-0 0.769
1985 Fendley, Don 8-3-1 0.708
1984 Fendley, Don 9-3-0 0.750
1983 Cassedy, Coley 12-2-0 0.857
1982 Cassedy, Coley 12-1-0 0.923
1981 Cassedy, Coley 9-2-0 0.792
1980 Cassedy, Coley 6-2-2 0.700
1979 Cassedy, Coley 10-1-0 0.909
1978 Cassedy, Coley 10-1-0 0.909
1977 Cassedy, Coley 9-2-1 0.792
1976 Cassedy, Coley 9-1-0 0.900
1975 Cassedy, Coley 6-4-0 0.600
1974 Braddy, Buddy 2-7-1 0.250
1973 Braddy, Buddy 1-9-0 0.100
1972 Braddy, Buddy 4-6-0 0.400
1971 Mitchell, Danny 3-7-0 0.300
1970 Mitchell, Danny 1-7-1 0.167

== Notable alumni ==
Name	Class year	Notability	Reference(s)
William Avery		NBA guard with the Minnesota Timberwolves (1999–02)	
Jason Childers		MLB reliever with the Tampa Bay Rays (2006)	
Matt Childers		MLB reliever for Milwaukee Brewers and Atlanta Braves (2002 & 2005)	
Sanders Commings		NFL cornerback with the Kansas City Chiefs (2013–14) and Minor League Baseball outfielder with the Danville Braves (2017)	
Mike Kelley		USFL, NFL, and CFL quarterback with the Tampa Bay Bandits, Memphis Showboats, San Diego Chargers, Memphis Mad Dogs (1983–95)	
Ricky Moore		Assistant basketball coach at the University of Connecticut	
Mike White		NFL DT with the Cincinnati Bengals and Seattle Seahawks (1979–82)	
