= Fram Reykjavík Basketball =

Körfkuknattleiksdeild Fram
- Nickname: Framarar, The Blues (Icelandic: Þeir Bláu)
- Founded: 1970
- History: Men's team 1970–1987; 2010–2013; Women's team 1971–1977
- Location: Reykjavík, Iceland
- Team colors: Blue and White
- Website: fram.is
Home	Away

Körfuknattleiksdeild Fram (English: Fram's basketball department) was the basketball department of Knattspyrnufélagið Fram, located in Reykjavík, Iceland.

== Men's basketball ==
=== History ===
In 1973 Fram participated in the first edition of the Icelandic Second Division and became its first winner.

From the following season, the 1974–75 season, Fram Reykjavík began their leadership in the First Division and their series of wins which ended in the 1985–86 season when they won their fourth title.

Fram's best season came in 1981–1982 when the team won the Icelandic cup and finished second in the Úrvalsdeild. The basketball department disbanded after the 1986–87 season but had a brief revitalization in the 2010s, playing three seasons in the Second Division from 2010 to 2013 and making it to the playoffs in 2012 and 2013.

=== Honours, trophies and achievements ===
- Icelandic Cup (1):
  - 1982
- Icelandic Division I (4):
  - 1974–75, 1978–79, 1980–81, 1985–86
- Icelandic Division II (1):
  - 1973–74

=== Notable players ===
Note: Flags indicate national team eligibility at FIBA-sanctioned events. Players may hold other non-FIBA nationalities not displayed.

Criteria

To appear in this section a player must have either:

- Set a club record or won an individual award while at the club
- Played at least one official international match for their national team at any time
- Played at least one official NBA match at any time.

- (Iceland) Björn Jónsson
- (Iceland) Flosi Sigurðsson
- (Iceland) Guðsteinn Ingimarsson
- (Iceland) Jóhannes Magnússon
- (United States) John Johnson
- (Iceland) Símon Ólafsson (1977–1987)
- (United States) Val Bracey
- (Iceland) Viðar Þorkelsson

== Women's basketball ==
=== History ===
Fram's women's basketball department was founded in March 1971. The club fielded a women's senior team in the Icelandic tournament for the first and only time during the 1976–77 season. The team folded after the annual Reykjavík Basketball Tournament in the fall of 1977.

=== Head coaches ===
- (Iceland) Davíð Janis
