= Icelandic Basketball Association =

Basketball governing body in Iceland

- Sport: Basketball
- Jurisdiction: Iceland
- Abbreviation: KKÍ
- Founded: 29 January 1961
- Affiliation: FIBA
- Regional affiliation: FIBA Europe
- Headquarters: Reykjavík
- Chairman: Kristinn Albertsson
- CEO: Hannes S. Jónsson
- Men's coach: Craig Pedersen
- Women's coach: Benedikt Guðmundsson

Official website
- www.kki.is
- (Iceland)

The Icelandic Basketball Association (Icelandic:Körfuknattleikssamband Íslands - KKÍ) is the national governing body of basketball in Iceland and is a member of the continental association FIBA Europe and the global International Basketball Federation (FIBA). It directs and oversees all of the national basketball teams of Iceland, including both the junior and senior national teams of both men and women.

It was founded on 29 January 1961; its first chairman was Bogi Þorsteinsson and the current chairman is Kristinn Albertsson.

== Competitions ==
- Men's
  - Domino's deild karla
  - Division I (Icelandic: 1. deild karla)
  - Division II (Icelandic: 2. deild karla)
  - Division III (Icelandic: 3. deild karla)
- Women's
  - Domino's deild kvenna
  - Division I (Icelandic: 1. deild kvenna)
  - Division II (Icelandic: 2. deild kvenna)

== National teams ==
=== Iceland men ===
- Iceland men's national basketball team
- Iceland men's national under-20 basketball team
- Iceland men's national under-19 basketball team
- Iceland men's national under-17 basketball team

=== Iceland Women ===
- Iceland women's national basketball team
- Iceland women's national under-20 basketball team
- Iceland women's national under-19 basketball team
- Iceland women's national under-17 basketball team

== Awards ==
- Icelandic Basketball Player of the Year

== Chairmen ==
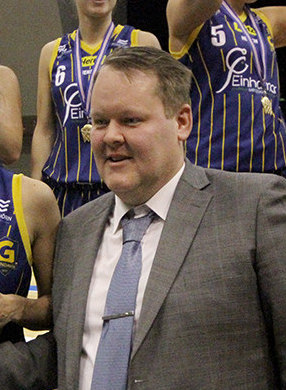
Hannes Jónsson

- Bogi Þorsteinsson 1961–1969
- Hólmsteinn Sigurðsson 1969–1973
- Einar Bollason 1973–1976
- Páll Júlíusson 1976–1977
- Sigurður Ingólfsson 1978–1979
- Stefán Ingólfsson 1979–1980
- Kristbjörn Albertsson 1980
- Stefán Ingólfsson 1980–1981
- Kristbjörn Albertsson 1981–1982
- Helgi Ágústsson 1982–1983
- Þórdís Anna Kristjánsdóttir 1983–1984
- Eiríkur Ingólfsson 1984–1985
- Björn Björgvinsson 1985–1988
- Kolbeinn Pálsson 1988–1996
- Ólafur Rafnsson 1996–2006
- Hannes S. Jónsson 2006–2023
- Guðbjörg Norðfjörð 2023–2025
- Kristinn Albertsson 2025–present
