= Íþróttafélag Stúdenta =

- Founded: 21 January 1928; 98 years ago
- Arena: Íþróttahús kennaraháskólans
- Location: Reykjavík, Iceland
- Team colors: Red, white
- Affiliation: International School Sport Federation

Íþróttafélag Stúdenta (Icelandic pronunciation: [ˈiːˌθrouhtaˌfjɛːˌlaːɣ ˈstuːtɛnta], lit. 'Students Sports Club'), commonly known as ÍS, is an Icelandic multi-sport club based in Reykjavík, Iceland. It was founded by students of University of Iceland on 21 January 1928. Since its foundation, the club has been involved in various sports, most notably wrestling, basketball and volleyball.

== History ==
Soon after its foundation, the club started with general gymnastics and wrestling exercises for students of the University of Iceland. The first chairman of the club was Þorgrímur V. Sigurðsson. The club thrived for the first few semesters and sent wrestlers to exhibitions competition at the international student sports tournament in Germany in 1929.

In the 1940s, the club hosted regular football matches with students from Menntaskólinn í Reykjavík, and in 1940 ÍS participated in the first Icelandic handball tournament. In those years, however, the name of the club was somewhat erratic and it was often called the University Sports Club or similar names.

Around 1940, the future of the club seemed bright. Alexander Jóhannesson, Rector of the University, was very interested in increasing the importance of sports within the university. There was talk of making sports a compulsory subject and that the school would nurture high-achieving athletes, as was the custom in American universities. Drawings were made for a sports hall for the school, which had become by far the largest in the country, as well as a swimming pool. Eventually, however, a much smaller gymnasium was built on the school grounds, and sports never made it to the curriculum.

ÍS was for years one of the strongest basketball teams in the country. Its women's team was one of the more successful teams in Icelandic basketball, winning three national championships and seven Icelandic Basketball Cups. Its men's team won the national championship once, in 1959, and the Icelandic Basketball Cup once, in 1978. The club also boasts a number of volleyball championships.

In 2002 the university stopped sponsoring the club which led to financial difficulties. Its men's basketball team folded after the 2005-2006 season and its women's team folded after 2006-2007 season when most of the players moved over to Valur's newly resurrected women's team. In recent years, the activities have decreased and ÍS no longer sends teams to the Icelandic tournaments.

== Basketball ==
=== Men's basketball ===
==== Honours ====
Úrvalsdeild karla

- Winners (1): 1959

Icelandic Basketball Cup

- Winners (1): 1978

Division I

- Winners (4): 1966, 1968, 1971, 1984

==== European record ====
Season	Competition	Round	Opponent	Home	Away	Aggregate
1978–79	FIBA European Cup Winners' Cup	2Q	(Spain) FC Barcelona	79–125	79–124	158–249

==== Notable players ====
Note: Flags indicate national team eligibility at FIBA-sanctioned events. Players may hold other non-FIBA nationalities not displayed.

Criteria

To appear in this section a player must have either:

- Set a club record or won an individual award while at the club
- Played at least one official international match for their national team at any time
- Played at least one official NBA match at any time.

- (Iceland) Bjarni Gunnar Sveinsson
- (United States) Dirk Dunbar
- (Iceland) Gísli Gíslason
- (Iceland) Guðni Ólafur Guðnason sr.
- (Iceland) Guðni Ólafur Guðnason jr.
- (Iceland) Ingi Stefánsson
- (Iceland) Ívar Ásgrímsson
- (United States) John Johnson
- (Iceland) Jón Eysteinsson
- (Iceland) Jón Oddsson
- (Iceland) Kristinn Jörundsson
- (Iceland) Kristinn V. Jóhannsson
- (Iceland) Kolbeinn Kristinsson
- (Iceland) Steinn Sveinsson
- (Iceland) Svali Björgvinsson
- (United States) Trent Smock
- (Iceland) Þórir Arinbjarnarson

==== Notable coaches ====
- (Iceland) Benedikt Jakobsson
- (Iceland) Birgir Örn Birgis (1977–1980)
- (Iceland) Guðni Ólafur Guðnason (1994–1996)

=== Women's basketball ===
==== Honours ====
Úrvalsdeild kvenna

- Winners (3): 1978, 1984, 1991

Icelandic Basketball Cup

- Winners (7): 1978, 1980, 1981, 1985, 1991, 2003, 2006

Icelandic Basketball Supercup

- Winners (1): 1998

==== Individual awards ====
- Úrvalsdeild Women's Domestic Player of the Year
  - Alda Leif Jónsdóttir - 2002
- Úrvalsdeild Women's Domestic All-First Team
  - Alda Leif Jónsdóttir - 1997, 1998, 1999, 2002, 2004, 2005
  - Signý Hermannsdóttir - 1999, 2005, 2006
  - Svandís Anna Sigurðardóttir - 2003
  - Lovísa Guðmundsdóttir - 2002
  - Vigdís Þórisdóttir - 1991, 1992
  - Hafdís Helgadóttir - 1991

==== Notable players ====
Note: Flags indicate national team eligibility at FIBA-sanctioned events. Players may hold other non-FIBA nationalities not displayed.

Criteria

To appear in this section a player must have either:

- Set a club record or won an individual award while at the club
- Played at least one official international match for their national team at any time
- Played at least one official NBA match at any time.

- (Iceland) Alda Leif Jónsdóttir
- (Iceland) Anna Björk Bjarnadóttir
- (Iceland) Ásta Óskarsdóttir
- (Iceland) Hafdís Helgadóttir
- (Iceland) Helga Friðriksdóttir
- (Iceland) Helga Jónasdóttir
- (Iceland) Kristjana Magnúsdóttir
- (Iceland) Lovísa Guðmundsdóttir
- (Iceland) María B. Leifsdóttir
- (Iceland) Signý Hermannsdóttir
- (Iceland) Stella Rún Kristjánsdóttir
- (Iceland) Svandís Anna Sigurðardóttir
- (Iceland) Þórunn Bjarnadóttir
- (Iceland) Vanda Sigurgeirsdóttir
- (Iceland) Vigdís Þórisdóttir

==== Notable coaches ====
- (United States) Dirk Dunbar (1977–1978)
- (United States) Trent Smock (1979–1980)
- (Iceland) Birgir Mikaelsson (1994–1995)
- (Iceland) Ívar Ásgrímsson

== Volleyball ==
=== Men's volleyball ===
- Icelandic champions: 10
  - 1970, 1971, 1975, 1976, 1978, 1988, 1992, 2000, 2001, 2002
- Icelandic Cup: 10
  - 1975, 1976, 1979, 1984, 1987, 1989, 1999, 2000, 2001, 2002

=== Women's volleyball ===
- Icelandic champions: 8
  - 1982, 1985, 1986, 1990, 1992, 1994, 1997, 1999
- Icelandic Cup: 12
  - 1979, 1980, 1981, 1982, 1985, 1986, 1992, 1994, 1996, 1997, 1998, 1999
