= Valur (men's basketball) =

- Leagues: Úrvalsdeild karla
- Founded: 25 December 1951; 74 years ago (as Gosi)
- History: Gosi (1951–1957); KFR (1957–1970); Valur (1970–2000); Valur/Fjölnir (2000–2001); Valur (2001–present)
- Arena: Hlíðarendi
- Location: Reykjavík, Iceland
- Team colors: red, white, blue
- President: Svali Björgvinsson
- Head coach: Finnur Freyr Stefánsson
- Assistant: Jamil Abiad
- Championships: 4 Icelandic Championships
- Website: Valur.is
Home	Away

The Valur men's basketball team, commonly known as Valur, is a basketball team based in Reykjavík, Iceland. It is part of the Valur multi-sport club.

== History ==
The club was founded as Gosi on 25 December 1951 and was one of the founding members of the Icelandic men's top division. On 22 December 1957 the club changed its name to Körfuknattleiksfélag Reykjavíkur (English: Reykjavík Basketball Club) and played under that name until 1970. On 3 October 1970 the club merged into Valur sports club and became its basketball department.

Under the new name, Valur had considerable success in the 1980s, winning the Icelandic championship two times, in 1980 and 1983, and the Icelandic cup three times, 1980, 1981 and 1983.

In 1992, Valur reached the Úrvalsdeild finals where it lost to Keflavík 2–3.

In 2022, Valur won its third national championship after beating Tindastóll in the Úrvalsdeild finals. On 2 October 2022, Valur won its first Super Cup, after defeating Icelandic Cup holders Stjarnan 80–77.

On 14 January 2023, Valur won its fourth Icelandic Cup title, and its first in 40 years, after defeating Stjarnan in the Cup final.

== Honours ==
Úrvalsdeild karla

- Winners (4): 1980, 1983, 2022, 2024

Icelandic Cup

- Winners (5): 1980, 1981, 1983, 2023, 2025

Icelandic Super Cup

- Winners (2): 2022, 2023

Division I

- Winners (2): 1997, 2002

=== Individual awards ===
- Úrvalsdeild Men's Domestic Player of the Year
  - Kári Jónsson – 2023
  - Kristófer Acox – 2022
  - Magnús Matthíasson – 1991
  - Rick Hockenos – 1978
  - Torfi Magnússon – 1982
  - Þórir Magnússon – 1974
- Úrvalsdeild Men's Foreign Player of the Year
  - Tim Dwyer – 1979, 1980, 1983
- Úrvalsdeild Men's Domestic All-First Team
  - Kári Jónsson – 2023
  - Kristófer Acox – 2021, 2022, 2023
  - Magnús Matthíasson – 1991, 1993
  - Tómas Holton – 1989
- Úrvalsdeild Men's Young Player of the Year
  - Magnús Matthíasson – 1991
- 1. deild karla Player of the Year
  - Ragnar Jónsson – 1997
- 1. deild karla Coach of the Year
  - Torfi Magnússon – 1997
- Icelandic Cup Finals MVP
  - Kári Jónsson – 2023
  - Taiwo Badmus – 2025

== Notable players ==
Note: Flags indicate national team eligibility at FIBA-sanctioned events. Players may hold other non-FIBA nationalities not displayed.

Criteria

To appear in this section a player must have either:

- Set a club record or won an individual award while at the club
- Played at least one official international match for their national team at any time
- Played at least one official NBA match at any time.

- (Iceland) Bárður Eyþórsson
- (Iceland) Brynjar Karl Sigurðsson
- (Iceland) Einar Matthíasson
- (Iceland) Einar Ólafsson
- (Iceland) Flosi Sigurðsson
- (United States) Frank Booker
- (Iceland) Frank Aron Booker
- (Iceland) Guðmundur Árnason
- (Iceland) Herbert Arnarson
- (Iceland) Hjálmar Stefánsson
- (Iceland) Ingi Þorsteinsson
- (Iceland) Ívar DeCarsta Webster
- (Iceland) Jóhannes Magnússon
- (Iceland) Jónatan James Bow
- (Iceland) Jón Arnór Stefánsson
- (Iceland) Jón H. Steingrímsson
- (Iceland) Kári Jónsson
- (Iceland) Kári Marísson
- (Iceland) Kristinn Pálsson
- (Iceland) Kristján Ágústsson
- (Iceland) Kristófer Acox
- (Iceland) Leifur Gústafsson
- (Iceland) Magnús Konráð Sigurðarson
- (Iceland) Magnús Matthíasson
- (Iceland) Marinó Sveinsson
- (Iceland) Matthías Matthíasson
- (Portugal) Miguel Cardoso
- (Iceland) Pavel Ermolinskij
- (Iceland) Pétur Guðmundsson
- (Iceland) Ólafur Þór Thorlacius
- (Iceland) Ragnar Nathanaelsson
- (United States) Rick Hockenos
- (Iceland) Ríkharður Hrafnkelsson
- (Iceland) Sigurður Már Helgason
- (Iceland) Símon Ólafsson
- (Iceland) Stefán Bjarkason
- (Iceland) Sturla Örlygsson
- (Iceland) Svali Björgvinsson
- (United States) Tim Dwyer
- (Iceland) Torfi Magnússon
- (Iceland) Tómas Holton
- (Iceland) Valdimar Guðlaugsson
- (Iceland) Þórir Magnússon

== Coaches ==
- (Iceland) Ólafur Þór Thorlacius 1970–1974
- (Iceland) Guðmundur Þorsteinsson 1974–1976
- (United States) Tim Dwyer 1978–1980, 1982–1983
- (Soviet Union) Vladimir Obuchov 1990–1991
- (Iceland) Tómas Holton 1991–1992
- (Iceland) Svali Björgvinsson 1992–1993, 1994, 1997–1999
- (Iceland) Ágúst Björgvinsson 2011–2019
- (Iceland) Finnur Freyr Stefánsson 2020–present

== European record ==
Season	Competition	Round	Opponent	Home	Away	Aggregate
1980–81	FIBA European Cup Winners' Cup	1Q	(Socialist Federal Republic of Yugoslavia) Cibona Zagreb	79–110	90–120	169–230
1981–82	FIBA European Cup Winners' Cup	1Q	(England) Crystal Palace	80–118	81–104	161–222
1992–93	FIBA Korać Cup	1Q	(France) CRO Lyon	74–109	88–128	162–237
