= Úrvalsdeild karla (basketball) =

Premier basketball league in Iceland

- Founded: 1951; 75 years ago
- First season: 1952
- Country: Iceland
- Confederation: FIBA Europe
- Number of teams: 12
- Level on pyramid: 1
- Relegation to: 1. deild
- Domestic cup: Bikarkeppni KKÍ
- Supercup: Meistarakeppni karla
- Current champions: Grindavík(4th title)
- Most championships: KR (18 titles)
- All-time top scorer: Valur Ingimundarson
- CEO: Hannes S. Jónsson
- TV partners: Stöð 2 Sport
- Website: www.kki.is
- 2024–25 Úrvalsdeild karla

Úrvalsdeild karla (English: Men's Premier League), also known as Bónus deild karla for sponsorship reasons, is the highest men's professional basketball competition among clubs in Iceland, where play determines the national champion. It is organized by the Icelandic Basketball Federation (Icelandic: Körfuknattleikssamband Íslands - KKÍ). The season consists of a home-and-away schedule of 22 games, followed by an eight-team playoff round. Quarterfinals, semifinals and finals series are best-of-five. The bottom clubs are relegated, and replaced by the top team from the regular-season phase and the four-team playoff round winner of the second-level First Division (Icelandic: 1. deild karla).

== History ==
=== Creation and first years 1951–1959 ===
The league was founded in 1951 as 1. deild karla (English: Men's 1st division) and its first season was played in April 1952 with five teams, Íþróttafélag Keflavíkurflugvallar (ÍKF), Íþróttafélag Reykjavíkur (ÍR), Íþróttafélag Stúdenta (ÍS), Gosi and Glímufélagið Ármann, participating. The team of ÍKF had the advantage of its close proximity with the US Naval Air Station at Keflavík International Airport and therefore could play competitive games with American players who had high school and college experience. They were furthermore coached by two American naval personnel, Gene Croley and James H. Wahl. During the tournament, ÍKF won all four of its games with an average of 10.8 points.

For the first years decade the league was dominated by ÍKF (with 4 wins) and ÍR (with 3 wins); with ÍS finally breaking their dominance in 1959.

=== ÍR's dominance and the arrival of the Americans 1960–1980 ===
From 1960 to 1964, ÍR, under the leadership of Helgi Jóhannsson, won five straight championships followed by KR winning four straight. From 1969 to 1977, ÍR added seven championships in 9 years. Its last victory in 1977 marked an end of an era and the rise of the Suðurnes rivals Keflavík and Njarðvík.

In September 1975, Jimmy Rogers became the first foreign born professional basketball player in Iceland when he signed a three-month contract with Ármann in preparations for their games against Honka Playboys in the FIBA European Cup Winners' Cup. Shortly later, KR signed fellow American Curtis Carter who immediately caught the attention of the fans and media with his powerful play and dunks. Together, they were credited for revolutionizing the Icelandic basketball scene. More Americans followed, including Rick Hockenos, Tim Dwyer and Danny Shouse.

=== Njarðvík's leadership ===
The next two decades, exactly from 1980–81 season to the 1997–98 season, Njarðvík (known as ÍKF until 1969) lead the league with 10 wins. In the same period, Keflavík won 4 titles and the KR won their eighth title.

=== Modern era ===
From the 2000–01 season, many teams have divided the lead of the league. In the 2005–06 season, the Njarðvík won their thirteenth title. In the following season, the 2006–07 season, the KR won their tenth title and one more year later, in the 2007–08 season, the Keflavík won their ninth title.

In July 2024, supermarket chain Bónus became the main sponsor of KKÍ, with the Úrvalsdeild taking the name Bónus deild karla.

== Teams ==
The Úrvalsdeild karla originated in 1951 and, currently, consists of 12 teams. The current Úrvalsdeild karla teams for the 2024–25 season are:

Team	City, Region	Arena	Founded	Colours	Head coach
Álftanes	Álftanes	Forsetahöllin	2007		(Iceland) Kjartan Atli Kjartansson
Grindavík	Grindavík	HS-Orku Höllin	1972		(Iceland) Jóhann Þór Ólafsson
Haukar	Hafnarfjörður	Ásvellir	1971		(Iceland) Friðrik Ingi Rúnarsson
Höttur	Egilsstaðir	MVA Höllin	1974		(Iceland) Viðar Örn Hafsteinsson
ÍR	Reykjavík	Hertz Hellirinn	1950		(North Macedonia) Borce Ilievski
Keflavík	Keflavík	Blue Höllin	1974		(Iceland) Sigurður Ingimundarson
KR	Reykjavík	DHL Höllin	1956		(Iceland) Jakob Sigurðarson
Njarðvík	Njarðvík	Ljónagryfjan	1952 (as ÍKF)		(Iceland) Runar Ingi Erlingsson
Stjarnan	Garðabær	Mathús Garðabæjar Höllin	1993		(Iceland) Baldur Þór Ragnarsson
Tindastóll	Sauðárkrókur	Sauðárkrókur	1907		(Iceland) Benedikt Guðmundsson
Valur	Reykjavík	Origo Höllin	1951 (as Gosi)		(Iceland) Finnur Freyr Stefánsson
Þór Þorlákshöfn	Þorlákshöfn	Icelandic Glacial Höllin	1991		(Iceland) Lárus Jónsson

== Champions ==
Season	Champion	Score	Runner-up	Champion's coach
1952	ÍKF	League	ÍR	(United States) Gene Croley and (United States) James H. Wahl
1953	ÍKF (2)	League	ÍR	
1954	ÍR	League	ÍKF	(Iceland) Helgi Jóhannsson
1955	ÍR (2)	League	Gosi	(Iceland) Helgi Jóhannsson
1956	ÍKF (3)	League	ÍR	
1957	ÍR (3)	League		(Iceland) Helgi Jóhannsson
1958	ÍKF (4)	League	ÍS	
1959	ÍS	League	ÍR	
1960	ÍR (4)	League	KFR	(Iceland) Helgi Jóhannsson
1961	ÍR (5)	League	KFR	(Iceland) Helgi Jóhannsson
1962	ÍR (6)	League	Ármann	(Iceland) Helgi Jóhannsson
1963	ÍR (7)	League	Ármann	(Iceland) Helgi Jóhannsson and (Iceland) Einar Ólafsson
1964	ÍR (8)	League	Ármann	(Iceland) Helgi Jóhannsson
1965	KR	64–54 (Note: As KR and ÍR tied at the end of the season, an extra game was played for tiebreaking.)	ÍR	(United States) Philip Bensing (Note: Last name sometimes spelled Benzing.)
1966	KR (2)	League	ÍR	(United States) Philip Bensing or (United States) Thomas Curren (Note: The Icelandic Basketball Association lists Bensing as the coach of the 1966 team but other sources state that he left the job in December 1965 and that Curren started coaching at the club in January 1966. Curren was the head coach of the team during its games in the 1966–67 FIBA European Champions Cup in December 1966.)
1967	KR (3)	72–43 (Note: As KR and ÍR tied at the end of the season, an extra game was played for tiebreaking.)	ÍR	(Iceland) Einar Bollason
1968	KR (4)	League	ÍR	(United States) Gordon Godfrey
1969	ÍR (9)	68–41 (Note: As ÍR and KR tied at the end of the season, an extra game was played for tiebreaking.)	KR	(Iceland) Einar Ólafsson
1970	ÍR (10)	2–0 (Note: ÍR won the championship after the leagues first playoffs. A playoff format was not used again until the 1983–84 season.)	Ármann	(Iceland) Einar Ólafsson
1971	ÍR (11)	League	KR	(Iceland) Einar Ólafsson
1972	ÍR (12)	85–76 (Note: As KR and ÍR tied at the end of the season, an extra game was played for tiebreaking.)	KR	(Iceland) Einar Ólafsson
1972–73	ÍR (13)	91–73 (Note: As KR and ÍR tied at the end of the season, an extra game was played for tiebreaking.)	KR	(Iceland) Einar Ólafsson
1973–74	KR (5)	85–84 (Note: As KR and Ármann tied at the end of the season, an extra game was played for tiebreaking.)	Ármann	(Iceland) Einar Bollason
1974–75	ÍR (14)	League	KR	(Iceland) Einar Ólafsson
1975–76	Ármann	League	ÍR	(Iceland) Ingvar Sigurbjörnsson
1976–77	ÍR (15)	League	KR	(Iceland) Þorsteinn Hallgrímsson
1977–78	KR (6)	96–88 (Note: As KR and Njarðvík tied at the end of the season, an extra game was played for tiebreaking.)	Njarðvík	(United States) Andrew Piazza
1978–79	KR (7)	77–75 (Note: As KR and Valur tied at the end of the season, an extra game was played for tiebreaking.)	Valur	(Iceland) Gunnar Gunnarsson
1979–80	Valur	League	Njarðvík	(United States) Tim Dwyer
1980–81	Njarðvík (5)*	League	Valur	(United States) Danny Shouse
1981–82	Njarðvík (6)	League	Fram	(Iceland) Hilmar Hafsteinsson
1982–83	Valur (2)	League	Keflavík	(United States) Tim Dwyer (2)
1983–84	Njarðvík (7)	2–0	Valur	(Iceland) Gunnar Þorvarðarson
1984–85	Njarðvík (8)	2–1	Haukar	(Iceland) Gunnar Þorvarðarson (2)
1985–86	Njarðvík (9)	2–0	Haukar	(Iceland) Gunnar Þorvarðarson (3)
1986–87	Njarðvík (10)	2–0	Valur	(Iceland) Valur Ingimundarson
1987–88	Haukar	2–1	Njarðvík	(Iceland) Pálmar Sigurðsson
1988–89	Keflavík	2–1	KR	(Iceland) Jón Kr. Gíslason
1989–90	KR (8)	3–0	Keflavík	(Hungary) Dr. László Németh
1990–91	Njarðvík (11)	3–2	Keflavík	(Iceland) Friðrik Ingi Rúnarsson
1991–92	Keflavík (2)	3–2	Valur	(Iceland) Jón Kr. Gíslason (2)
1992–93	Keflavík (3)	3–0	Haukar	(Iceland) Jón Kr. Gíslason (3)
1993–94	Njarðvík (12)	3–2	Grindavík	(Iceland) Valur Ingimundarson (2)
1994–95	Njarðvík (13)	4–2	Grindavík	(Iceland) Valur Ingimundarson (3)
1995–96	Grindavík	4–2	Keflavík	(Iceland) Friðrik Ingi Rúnarsson (2)
1996–97	Keflavík (4)	3–0	Grindavík	(Iceland) Sigurður Ingimundarson
1997–98	Njarðvík (14)	3–0	KR	(Iceland) Friðrik Ingi Rúnarsson (3)
1998–99	Keflavík (5)	3–2	Njarðvík	(Iceland) Sigurður Ingimundarson (2)
1999–00	KR (9)	3–1	Grindavík	(Iceland) Ingi Þór Steinþórsson
2000–01	Njarðvík (15)	3–1	Tindastóll	(Iceland) Friðrik Ragnarsson and (Iceland) Teitur Örlygsson
2001–02	Njarðvík (16)	3–0	Keflavík	(Iceland) Friðrik Ragnarsson (2)
2002–03	Keflavík (6)	3–0	Grindavík	(Iceland) Sigurður Ingimundarson (3)
2003–04	Keflavík (7)	3–1	Snæfell	(Iceland) Falur Harðarson and (Iceland) Guðjón Skúlason
2004–05	Keflavík (8)	3–1	Snæfell	(Iceland) Sigurður Ingimundarson (4)
2005–06	Njarðvík (17)	3–1	Skallagrímur	(Iceland) Einar Árni Jóhannsson
2006–07	KR (10)	3–1	Njarðvík	(Iceland) Benedikt Guðmundsson
2007–08	Keflavík (9)	3–0	Snæfell	(Iceland) Sigurður Ingimundarson (5)
2008–09	KR (11)	3–2	Grindavík	(Iceland) Benedikt Guðmundsson (2)
2009–10	Snæfell	3–2	Keflavík	(Iceland) Ingi Þór Steinþórsson (2)
2010–11	KR (12)	3–1	Stjarnan	(Iceland) Hrafn Kristjánsson
2011–12	Grindavík (2)	3–1	Þór Þorlákshöfn	(Iceland) Helgi Jónas Guðfinnsson
2012–13	Grindavík (3)	3–2	Stjarnan	(Iceland) Sverrir Þór Sverrisson
2013–14	KR (13)	3–1	Grindavík	(Iceland) Finnur Freyr Stefánsson
2014–15	KR (14)	3–1	Tindastóll	(Iceland) Finnur Freyr Stefánsson (2)
2015–16	KR (15)	3–1	Haukar	(Iceland) Finnur Freyr Stefánsson (3)
2016–17	KR (16)	3–2	Grindavík	(Iceland) Finnur Freyr Stefánsson (4)
2017–18	KR (17)	3–1	Tindastóll	(Iceland) Finnur Freyr Stefánsson (5)
2018–19	KR (18)	3–2	ÍR	(Iceland) Ingi Þór Steinþórsson (3)
2019–20	Season discontinued due to the COVID-19 outbreak			
2020–21	Þór Þorlákshöfn (1)	3–1	Keflavík	(Iceland) Lárus Jónsson (1)
2021–22	Valur (3)	3–2	Tindastóll	(Iceland) Finnur Freyr Stefánsson (6)
2022–23	Tindastóll (1)	3–2	Valur	(Iceland) Pavel Ermolinskij (1)
2023–24	Valur (4)	3–2	Grindavík	(Iceland) Finnur Freyr Stefánsson (7)
2024–25	Stjarnan (1)	3–2	Tindastóll	(Iceland) Baldur Þór Ragnarsson (1)
2025–26	Grindavík (4)	3–1	Tindastóll	(Iceland) Jóhann Þór Ólafsson (1)

== Titles per club ==
Titles	Club
18	KR
17	Njarðvík / ÍKF^{1}
15	ÍR
9	Keflavík
4	Valur, Grindavík
1	Ármann, Haukar, ÍS, Snæfell, Stjarnan, Tindastóll, Þór Þorlákshöfn

1. ÍKF merged into Ungmennafélag Njarðvíkur in 1969 and became its basketball subdivision. It is today known as Njarðvík. The club won 4 titles under the ÍKF name and added 13 more after the merger

== Statistical leaders ==
The league has kept scoring stats since adopting the Úrvalsdeild karla name in 1978. During the 1988–1989 season, it added more categories, including rebounds, assists and steals and prior to the 1994–1995 season it added blocks.

=== Úrvalsdeild karla all-time scoring leaders ===
Player nationality set by the player's national team affiliation. In bold, active players.

Stats through end of 2024–25 Úrvalsdeild karla season:

Rank	Player	Games	Points	Average
1.	(Iceland) Valur Ingimundarson	400	7,355	18.4
2.	(Iceland) Páll Axel Vilbergsson	407	6,949	17.1
3.	(Iceland) Guðjón Skúlason	409	6,649	16.3
4.	(Iceland) Teitur Örlygsson	405	6,579	16.2
5.	(Iceland) Guðmundur Bragason	348	5,655	16.3

=== Úrvalsdeild karla all-time rebounding leaders ===
Player nationality set by the player's national team affiliation. In bold, active players.

Stats through the end of the 2024–25 Úrvalsdeild karla season:

Rank	Player	Games	Rebounds	Average
1.	(Iceland) Hlynur Bæringsson	423	4,129	9.8
2.	(Iceland) Guðmundur Bragason^{1}	332	3,260	9.8
3.	(Iceland) Friðrik Erlendur Stefánsson	357	3,212	9.0
4.	(Iceland) Ómar Örn Sævarsson	366	2,848	7.8
5.	(United States) John Rhodes	136	2,548	18.8

^{1} Statistics for rebounds where not kept during Guðmundur's first season. Overall, he played 348 games in the Úrvalsdeild.

=== Úrvalsdeild karla all-time assists leaders ===
Player nationality set by the player's national team affiliation. In bold, active players.

Stats through the end of the 2024–25 Úrvalsdeild karla season:

Rank	Player	Games	Assists	Average
1.	(Iceland) Hörður Axel Vilhjálmsson	294	1,783	6.1
2.	(Iceland) Justin Shouse	230	1,486	6.5
3.	(Iceland) Jón Arnar Ingvarsson	340	1,393	4.1
4.	(Iceland) **Ægir Þór Steinarsson**	188	1,364	7.3
5.	(Iceland) Jón Kr. Gíslason^{1}	214	1,359	6.4

^{1} Assists where not counted during Jón Kr. Gíslason's first five seasons where he played 93 games.

== Awards and honors ==
=== Domestic All-First Team ===
The Men's Domestic All-First Team is an annual Úrvalsdeild honor bestowed on the best players in the league following every season.

=== Úrvalsdeild Men's Playoffs MVP ===
Úrvalsdeild Playoffs MVP award is awarded annually to the player judged most valuable to his team during the Úrvalsdeild playoffs.

== See also ==
- Icelandic Men's Basketball Cup
- Úrvalsdeild karla (disambiguation)
- Úrvalsdeild kvenna (basketball), the women's basketball league
