= Tharald =

Tharald is a given name. Notable people with the name include:

- Tharald Brøvig Jr., Norwegian ship-owner and investor; grandson of Sr.
- Tharald Brøvig Sr., Norwegian ship-owner, newspaper editor and politician
- Tharald Høyerup Blanc, Norwegian theatre historian

== See also ==
- Tarald
- Thorald
- Thorvald
