= Lista =

Lista may refer to:

== Places ==
=== Norway ===
- Lista Lighthouse, a lighthouse in Farsund Municipality in Agder county
- Lista (peninsula), a peninsula in Farsund Municipality in Agder county
- Lista Municipality, a former municipality in the old Vest-Agder county

=== Spain ===
- Lista (Madrid), a ward in the Salamanca district of Madrid
- Lista (Madrid Metro), a station on Line 4 of the Madrid Metro
- Calle de Lista, the previous name of Calle José Ortega y Gasset in Madrid

=== Other ===
- Alfonso Lista, Ifugao (formerly known as Potia), a third-class municipality in the Philippines
- Lista Point on the northwest coast of Smith Island in the South Shetland Islands, Antarctica

== Media ==
- Lista de Espera, a year 2000 Cuban film
- Lista Przebojów Programu Trzeciego, the oldest and the longest-running music chart in Poland
- VG-lista, a Norwegian record chart

== People ==
- Alberto Lista (1775–1848), Spanish poet and educationalist
- Giovanni Lista (born 1943), Italian art historian and critic
- Hildemaro Lista (1905 – unknown), Uruguayan fencer
- Marquis of Lista, a former title of the Norwegian nobility associated with the eponymous town
- Michael Lista (born 1983), Canadian poet
- Stanislao Lista (1824–1908), Italian sculptor

== Politics ==
- Enotna Lista, an Austrian political party seeking to represent the Slovene minority in Carinthia
- Lista civica, the generic name for independent party lists at Italian local elections
- Lista della Libertà, a political coalition for the 2008 general election in San Marino
- Lista Mancini, a former regional political party in Calabria, Italy
- Zelena lista, a former green political party in Croatia

== Other uses ==
- Library, Information Science & Technology Abstracts (LISTA), an indexing and abstracting service
- Liquid-infused surfaces with trapped air, surfaces on which liquids cannot stick
- List A cricket
- Lista (moth), a genus of snout moths
- LISTA, a Swiss company
- Lista, an element in Microsoft Live Labs Listas
