= Tharald Brøvig Jr. =

Norwegian ship-owner and investor

Tharald Brøvig Jr. (21 May 1942 – 24 September 2017) was a Norwegian ship-owner and investor.

== Early and personal life ==
He was born in Farsund, the only child of Gunnar Christian Brøvig (1907–1944) and Ragnhild Mørch. He was a grandson of Tharald Brøvig Sr., and a nephew of Harald Nikolai Brøvig and Olav Selvaag.

His father was the leader of the family company, Th. Brøvig, but was killed in 1944 during the Second World War. Tharald Brøvig's uncles took over the company.

== Career ==
He finished his secondary education in 1961, entered the Norwegian School of Economics and Business Administration and graduated with an MBA degree from Harvard Business School in 1966. He worked as a finance analyst for Capital Research Company in the US and Switzerland, and ventured into investments. In 1972 he was involved in the family company Th. Brøvig, mainly with capital investment. He also became a board member of several companies where he had invested.

Investments in companies such as Tandberg, Hafslund Nycomed and particularly Norsk Data (which became defunct in 1992) "rescued the family shipping company through a substantial crisis in the 1980s". Brøvig was a board member of Norsk Data throughout the company's existence. Hafslund Nycomed was started when Hafslund bought Nycomed in the 1980s, and Brøvig was behind this as a board member of Hafslund. In 1992, the family shipping company was again saved, this time with the selling of Hafslund Nycomed shares. In Tandberg, Brøvig was chairman from 1985 to 1997, then in Tandberg Television.

Brøvig was also a board member of World Wildlife Fund in Norway from 1988 to 1996 (chair since 1994) and the Norwegian Shipowners' Association from 1990 to 1998 (vice president since 1996).

Brøvig moved from Switzerland to Norway in 1983. In January 1986 he married Inger Sande.
