= Taraldsen =

Taraldsen is a Norwegian patronymic surname, which means son of Tarald. Notable people with the surname include:

- Arne Taraldsen (1917–1989), Norwegian artist and resistance member
- Knut Tarald Taraldsen (born 1948), Norwegian linguist
