= Søndre Katland Lighthouse =

Coastal lighthouse in Norway

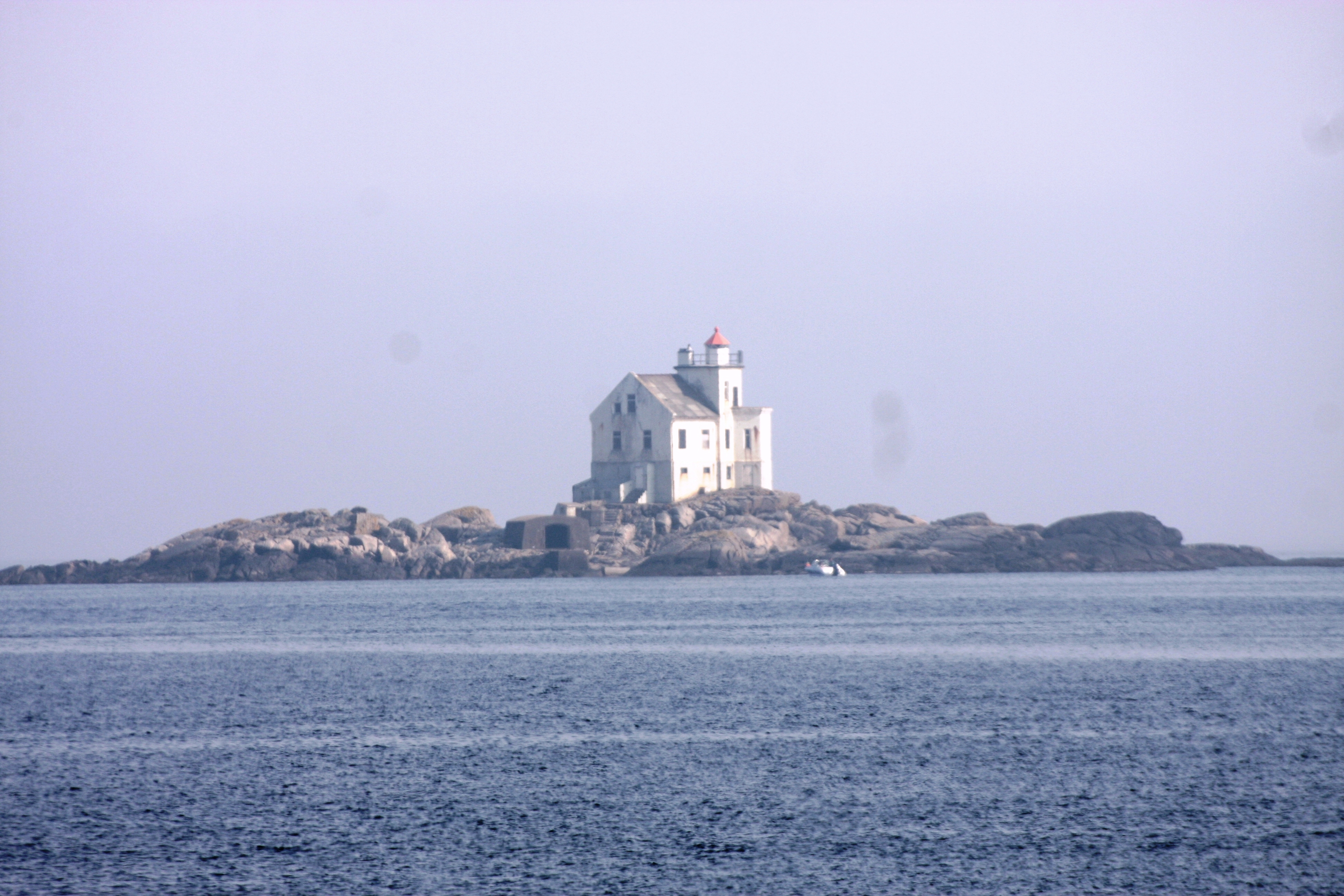
- View of the lighthouse, seen from Loshavn
- Location: Agder, Norway
- Coordinates: 58°03′24″N 06°50′25″E

Tower
- Constructed: 1878
- Height: 14.5 m (48 ft)

Light
- Focal height: 19.4 m (64 ft)
- Range: 6 nmi (11 km; 6.9 mi)
- Characteristic: Fl WRG 5s
- Norway no.: 084100

Søndre Katland is a coastal lighthouse in Farsund Municipality in Agder county, Norway. The lighthouse sits on a small island just south of the mouth of the Lyngdalsfjorden, about 5 kilometres (3.1 mi) southeast of the town of Farsund. The 14.5-metre (48 ft) tall lighthouse is white and built out of stone and concrete. It was completed in 1878. The light sits at an elevation of 19.5 metres (64 ft) above sea level. The light emits a white, red, or green (depending on direction) flash every 5 seconds. The site is only accessible by boat and it is not open to the public.

== See also ==
- Lighthouses in Norway
- List of lighthouses in Norway
