= Gunnar Christian Brøvig =

Gunnar Christian Brøvig (30 August 1907 – 8 September 1944) was a Norwegian ship-owner and resistance member.

He was born in Farsund as a son of Tharald Brøvig, Sr. and Cecilie Catharina, née Hoff. He had the much younger brother Harald Nikolai Brøvig and the sister Andrea Brøvig, who married Olav Selvaag. He had married Ragnhild Mørch in Borge Municipality in Østfold county in 1940, and they lived in Farsund. The couple had one child; the son Tharald Brøvig, Jr.

Brøvig had the cand.jur. degree, and after serving some time as a deputy judge he worked in the shipping business. From 1938 he was the leader of his father's company Th. Brøvig.

During the occupation of Norway by Nazi Germany he worked with illegal transport of refugees from the Nazi regime. He was a member of the resistance within Sivorg. He was arrested on 18 March 1944, and was incarcerated in Arkivet until 13 May, then in Grini concentration camp to 6 September 1944. He was then shipped on board the prisoner transport ship SS Westfalen. On 7 September 1944 the ship sank off Marstrand, probably hit by a naval mine. Seventy-eight people aboard survived, but most of the Norwegian prisoners-of-war were casualties, including Brøvig.
