= Farsund Airport, Lista =

Farsund Airport, Lista Farsund lufthavn, Lista
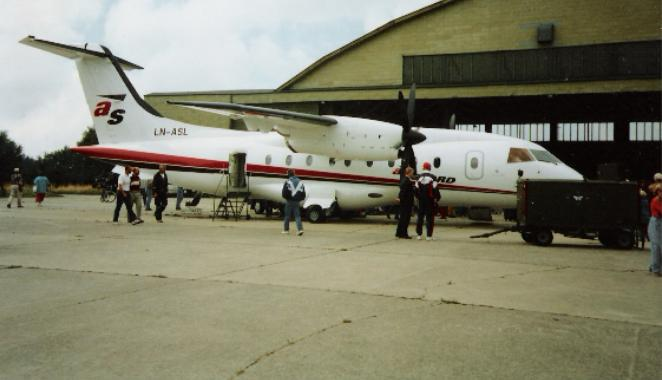
- Air Stord Dornier 328 in 1996
- IATA: none; ICAO: ENLI

Summary
- Airport type: Non Public
- Owner: Lista Flypark AS
- Serves: Farsund
- Location: Lista
- Elevation AMSL: 9 m / 29 ft
- Coordinates: 58°06′01″N 006°37′30″E
- Website: listalufthavn.no

Map

Runways
Direction	Length		Surface
Direction	m	ft	Surface
14/32	2,990	9,810	Concrete
~~09/27~~	~~1,494~~	~~4,902~~	~~Concrete~~

Farsund Airport, Lista (Norwegian: Farsund lufthavn, Lista, ICAO: ENLI) is an airport situated on the Lista peninsula in Farsund Municipality in Agder county, Norway. The village of Vestbygd lies on the southwest side of the airport and the small village of Ore lies on the northeast side. The airport features a 2,990-meter (9,810 ft) concrete runway aligned 14/32. Previously it also had a 1,494-meter (4,902 ft) runway aligned 09/27. Farsund Airport, Lista is the civilian sector of the now closed Lista Air Station. Previously a regional airport, it is now only used for general aviation.

The airbase was built by the Luftwaffe during the German occupation of Norway, opening in steps between 1941 and 1944. It was taken over by the Royal Norwegian Air Force from 1945. Civilian operations originally commenced in 1955 when Braathens SAFE started services with their de Havilland Heron. Nordsjøfly and its successor Norving flew from 1980 to 1988. The air station was closed in 1996 and the aerodrome privatized. Air Stord operated flights from 1996 to 1999 and since there have been no scheduled services.

== History ==
Construction of Lista Air Station began was started by Luftwaffe in September 1940. It was part of a major investment in defenses built in Lista, known as Lista Fortress and was part of the Atlantic Wall. The base opened in April 1941, consisting of a 1,700 by 120 meters (5,580 by 390 ft) wooden runway. The second phase of construction was completed in 1944 and resulted in an array of support infrastructure and a 1,571 by 80 meters (5,154 by 262 ft) concrete runway.

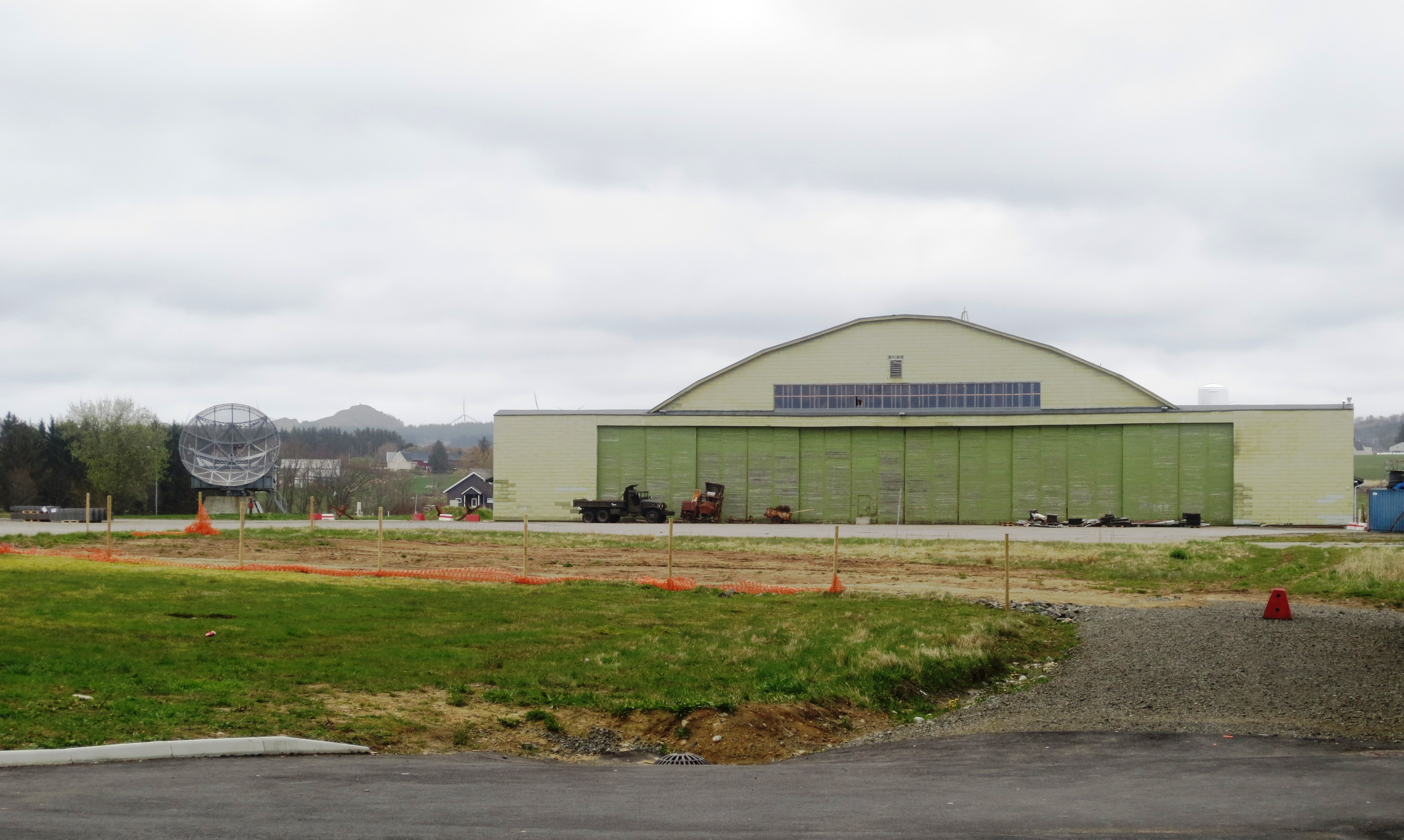
Three of the hangars from the Second World War still stand

The airport was taken over by the Royal Norwegian Air Force in November 1945. It was initially proposed closed, but in 1948 it was decided that the facility should be reopened. Lista never received any permanent stationing of squadrons, instead supporting various training schools and missions. From 1951 to 1953 and important part of the air station was the shooting field Marka. Between 1955 and 1959 the base underwent a major redevelopment. Through funding from the North Atlantic Treaty Organization (NATO), List was designated a full-scale reserve base. This involved the construction of a new, 2,990-meter (9,810 ft) runway and taxiway and stands for two squadrons of fighter jets, each in a designated area.

Braathens SAFE was the first airline to operate out of Farsund Airport, Lista. Starting on 6 June 1955, Braathens SAFE started landing some of the Oslo–Stavanger planes at Kristiansand Airport, Kjevik and Farsund Airport, Lista. The route, nicknamed the "Milk Route", operated Stavanger – Farsund – Kristiansand – Tønsberg – Oslo in the morning, with a return in the evening. It was flown using the de Havilland Heron. Braathens terminated its services on 15 May 1959 when the Herons were retired. The airport did not generate sufficient patronage to support the larger successor aircraft, the Fokker F27 Friendship.

Braathens resumed services during the 1960s, later using the Fokker F28 Fellowship. The twice-daily stopover on a Stavanger to Oslo flight was loss-bringing for Braathens, but part of their concession which secured them a monopoly on several profitable domestic services. For a period in 1977 the services were terminated when there was no fire-fighting service available at the airport. Braathens wet leased some flights from Busy Bee using a Short Skyvan, as the F28s were often too large for the services to Stavanger. The Ministry of Transport and Communications gave Braathens permission to withdraw from the Lista service at the end of the summer schedule of 1980, which the airline did.

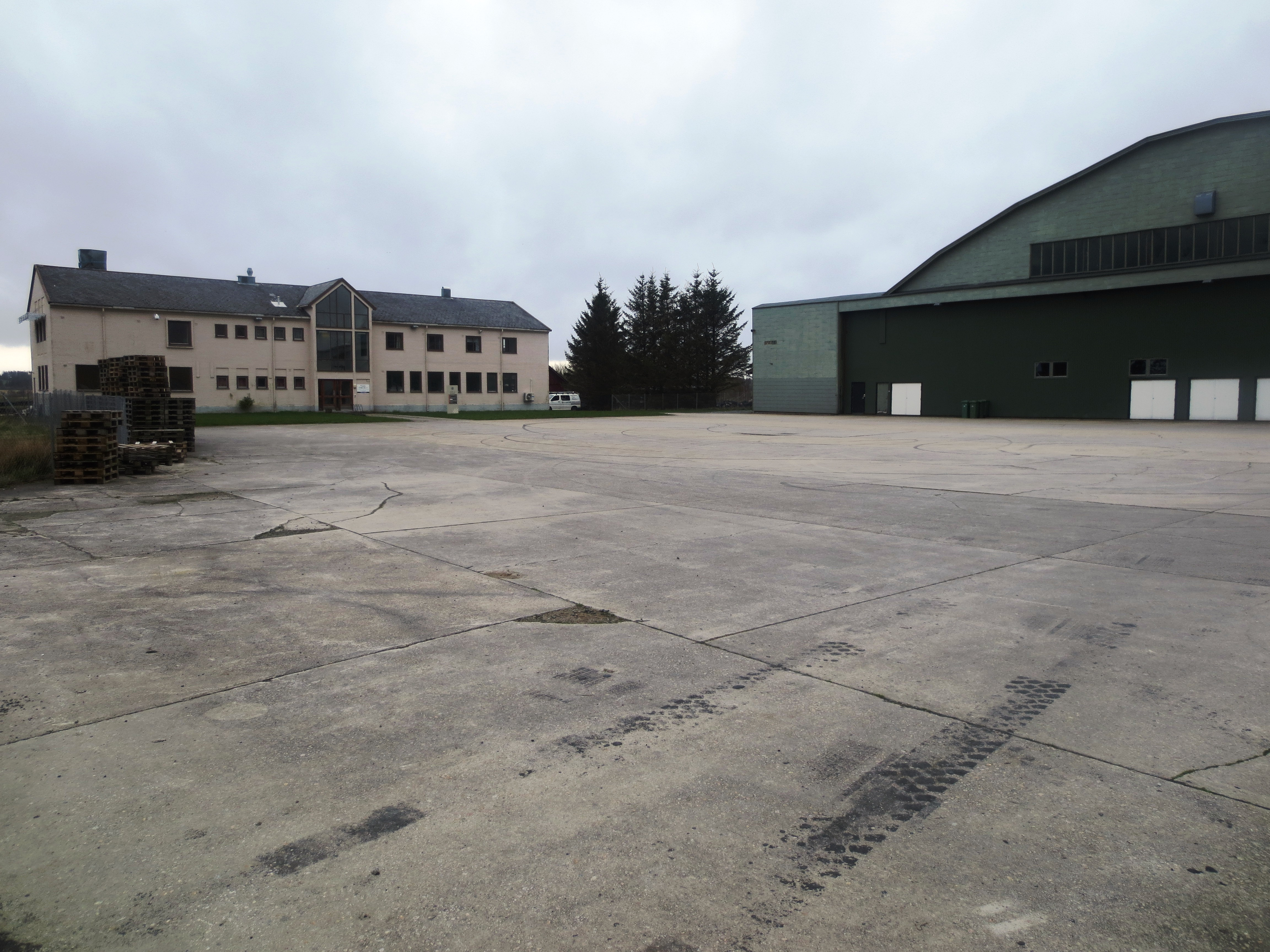
Hangar and redeveloped building

With Braathens' withdrawal, both Nordsjøfly and Norving skirmished to apply for a concession. Nordsjøfly was awarded the privilege. Norving bought Nordsjøfly in 1982 and incorporated it into its operations, taking over the Farsund route. Busy Bee and Norving applied to operate services from Stavanger to Sandefjord Airport, Torp and Skien Airport, Geiteryggen, respectively. Both were granted their requests, on the condition they make a stop-over at Lista. Busy Bee protested by not starting the route, while Norving started flying in May 1983 with a Cessna Conquest. The route was terminated in February 1988 when Norving pulled out of all scheduled services in Southern Norway.

Due to the restructuring of the military in the 1990s, Parliament voted on 8 June 1994 to close Lista Air Station. Effective from 1 June 1996, the military was set to retain ownership of the facility for ten years. Parliament granted the Defence Estates Agency the right to sell the air station for market price as part of a large-scale sale of defunct military estates. The condition was that any other state or public uses be given priority and that the sale take place through an open sales process.

Lista Airport Development was established on 16 September 1994 and it established Lista Lufthavn on 3 May 1996. In June 1996 the Defence Estates Agency signed a ten-year lease on the entire air station with the latter company for an annual rent of 10,000 Norwegian krone per year. The agency retained the responsibility to maintain the property. Lista Lufthavn received an option for the company to buy the entire facility for NOK 25 million.

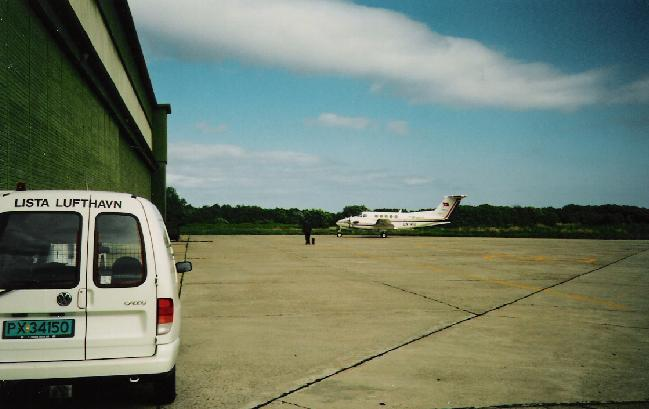
Ugland Air aircraft at Lista in 1997

Air Stord commenced scheduled services twice a day from Lista to Oslo and Stavanger from 24 June. Initially they used a ten-passenger Beechcraft King Air 200, later increasing to a nineteen-passenger Beechcraft 19. This was secured through two local shipping companies and the municipalities buying a significant portion of the airline. The Stavanger route was later cut. Air Stord's Oslo-route was terminated on 20 February 1999 when the company filed for bankruptcy.

In 1999 the agency were in talks with Farsund Municipality, but stipulated a sales price of NOK 200 million. The municipality therefore withdrew their interest. The agency sold the air station to Lista Flypark. They took over ownership on 9 December 2002. The air station was valuated at NOK 11 million, yet sold for NOK 3.5 million. There was no documentation for why this discount was given. Both Lista Lufthavn and Lista Flypark's contracts were such structured that they had incentives to delay any commercial development of the property. The sale was carried out without public announcement. Eight sections were also sold between 1998 and 2003 without announcement. Avinor asked to take over the control tower and the Directorate for Nature Management asked to take over Slevdalsvannet, but both of these requests were ignored.

All in all the military spent NOK 53 million on the process of selling the property. Subtracted the sales price, this was what the military spend on operating the base after closure, maintaining it and in various discounts to purchasers for them to fix up the base after the sale took place. The scandal resulted in Parliament changing the sales procedures so that they had to be approved of by the government.

Lista Lufthavn signed an agreement with CHC Helikopter Service to use Lista as a reserve airport should Sola become unavailable. There was limited use of the airport and CHC terminated the agreement in March 2007. However, this status allowed the aerodrome flight information service (AFIS) service to be retained. This was closed on 1 September 2007.

Slevdalsvannet Nature Reserve was established in 2005 and in 2014 three small lakes were artificially recreated. The site was bought by the Ministry of the Environment in 2013. Lista Air Show, presenting veteran military aircraft, was organized annual three times from 2009 through 2011, drawing up to 4,000 spectators. Lista Flyklubb was founded on 3 May 2010 and is based at the airport with two aircraft. The summer camp and skating park Flipside opened in a former hangar in 2013. It has a capacity for 1000 children and youth throughout the summer.

== Facilities ==
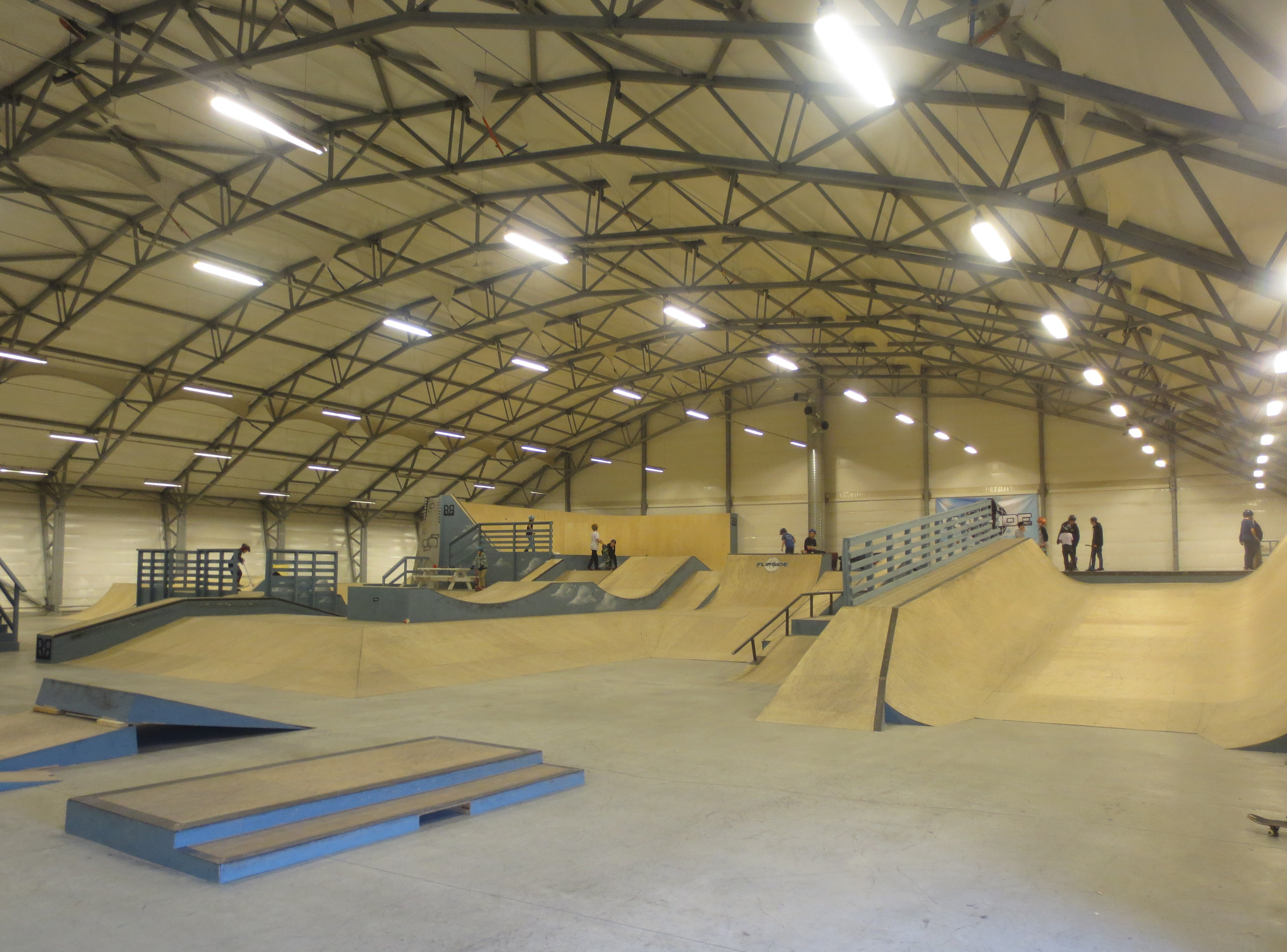
The interior of one of the hangars, since redeveloped to a skating park

Farsund Airport, Lista is on the flat section of the Lista peninsula in Farsund, Norway, between the villages of Vanse and Vestbygd, and 12 kilometers (7.5 mi) from Farsund. The airport lacks a staffed control tower and services are limited to visual flight rules in daylight with a maximum take-off weight of 5,700 kilograms (12,600 lb) and a maximum nine passengers. The airport has a reference elevation of 9 meters (30 ft) above mean sea level. It consists of one operative and one closed concrete runway. The main runway measures 2,990 by 45 meters (9,810 by 148 ft) and is aligned 14/32. Parallel to this runs a 2,500-meter (8,200 ft) concrete taxiway. There is a closed runway 1,570 meters (5,150 ft) long which is aligned 09/27.

Most of the base has been listed as a cultural heritage. This includes the runways, the taxiway and the road network, the remaining buildings from the Second World War and Marka. An important aspect when listing was that many of the structures had not been modified since the war. Slevdalsvannet Nature Reserve is southwest of the runway. A former lake, it has since been drained. It remains an important wetland area for migratory birds and is part of a Ramsar site.

== Airlines and destinations ==
Lista has a primary catchment area covering Lister, the traditional district covering the westernmost parts of Agder county, and a population of 35,000. This includes the towns of Farsund, Lyngdal and Flekkefjord. Lista is situated 80 minutes drive from Kristiansand Airport, Kjevik. For international flights, people living in Lister often instead use Stavanger Airport, Sola. The proximity to Kjevik has therefore severely limited the demand for an airport in Farsund.

Farsund Airport's main advantage is the long runway. This allows for large cargo aircraft and the occasional charter flight with large passenger aircraft. Lista can also be used in case of a closing of Kjevik. However, these uses occur only sporadically. There were also plans to use the airport for offshore helicopter transport to oil platforms in the North Sea. However, the lack of infrastructure, lack of a freeway to Kristiansand and lack of scheduled flights caused these plans to be terminated.

Kjevik has also received a similar airport competitor to the east, Arendal Airport, Gullknapp. Avinor, the state-owned operator of Kjevik, has stated that both Lista and Gullknapp, should then become operative with scheduled flights, would take away patronage from Kjevik and critical mass to establish new routes from Agder. On the contrary, some have called for the closing of Kjevik and instead that Agder be served by Lista and Gullknapp.

== Climate ==
Climate data for Lista Lighthouse in Farsund 1991-2020 (14 m)
Month	Jan	Feb	Mar	Apr	May	Jun	Jul	Aug	Sep	Oct	Nov	Dec	Year
Mean daily maximum °C (°F)	4.5 (40.1)	3.9 (39.0)	5.3 (41.5)	9 (48)	12.6 (54.7)	15.3 (59.5)	17.9 (64.2)	18.5 (65.3)	15.7 (60.3)	11.5 (52.7)	7.8 (46.0)	5.4 (41.7)	10.6 (51.1)
Daily mean °C (°F)	2.7 (36.9)	1.9 (35.4)	3.2 (37.8)	6.2 (43.2)	9.8 (49.6)	12.7 (54.9)	15.4 (59.7)	15.9 (60.6)	13.3 (55.9)	9.4 (48.9)	6 (43)	3.7 (38.7)	8.4 (47.1)
Mean daily minimum °C (°F)	0.6 (33.1)	0 (32)	1.2 (34.2)	3.7 (38.7)	7.2 (45.0)	10.3 (50.5)	12.9 (55.2)	13.3 (55.9)	11 (52)	7.1 (44.8)	3.9 (39.0)	1.3 (34.3)	6.0 (42.9)
Average precipitation mm (inches)	127.1 (5.00)	89.9 (3.54)	87.7 (3.45)	63.3 (2.49)	61.1 (2.41)	62.9 (2.48)	81.1 (3.19)	106 (4.2)	116 (4.6)	142.7 (5.62)	129.2 (5.09)	128.2 (5.05)	1,195.2 (47.12)
Average precipitation days (≥ 1 mm)	16	15	13	10	10	9	11	12	13	15	16	16	156
Source 1: Norwegian Meteorological Institute
Source 2: NOAA - WMO averages 91-2020 Norway

== Bibliography ==
- Arheim, Tom; Hafsten, Bjørn; Olsen, Bjørn; Thuve, Sverre (1994). Fra Spitfire til F-16: Luftforsvaret 50 år 1944–1994 (in Norwegian). Oslo: Sem & Stenersen. ISBN 82-7046-068-0.
- Ettrup, Erik; Schellenbergen, Daniel; Ritterbach, Erik (2007). Festung Lista (in Norwegian and German). Sandnes: Commentum Forlag. ISBN 978-82-92309-71-1.
- Gustavsen, Roar (2014). Flyplasshåndbok for Farsund lufthavn, Lista (PDF) (in Norwegian). Farsund: Lista Lufthavn. Archived from the original (PDF) on 25 December 2014.
- Hjelmeland, Britt-Elise (2000). Landsverneplan for Forsvaret : verneplan for eiendommer, bygninger og anlegg : Katalog Sør- og Vestlandet, Trøndelag og Nord-Norge (in Norwegian). Oslo: Forsvarets bygningstjeneste.
- Melling, Kjersti (2009). Nordavind fra alle kanter (in Norwegian). Oslo: Pilotforlaget.
- Office of the Auditor General of Norway (2005). Riksrevisjonens undersøkelse av salget av Lista flystasjon (in Norwegian).
- Tjomsland, Audun; Wilsberg, Kjell (1995). Braathens SAFE 50 år: Mot alle odds (in Norwegian). Oslo. ISBN 82-990400-1-9.
