= Ore, Farsund =

Village in Farsund Municipality, Norway

Ore
- Village
- Interactive map of Ore
- Coordinates: 58.11667°N 6.63333°E
- Country: Norway
- Region: Southern Norway
- County: Agder
- District: Lister
- Municipality: Farsund Municipality
- Elevation: 32 m (105 ft)
- Time zone: UTC+01:00 (CET)
  - Summer (DST): UTC+02:00 (CEST)
- Post Code: 4560 Vanse

Ore is a small village in Farsund Municipality in Agder county, Norway. The village is located on the Lista peninsula about 3.5 kilometres (2.2 mi) west of the village of Vanse. The village sits on the northeast side of the Farsund Airport, Lista. Ore School, an elementary school serving this part of Farsund was located in the village.
