= Tharald Brøvig Sr. =

Norwegian ship-owner, newspaper editor and politician

Tharald Brøvig Sr. (3 July 1877 – 22 August 1938) was a Norwegian ship-owner, newspaper editor and politician for the Conservative Party. He is the namesake of the company Th. Brøvig.

== Personal life ==
He was born in Kristiansand as a son of shipmaster Gunder Christian Brøvig (1850–1921) and Bolette Andrea Davidsen (1852–1927). The family moved to Farsund. In 1906 Tharald married jurist's daughter Cecilie Catharina Hoff (1879–1963). They had several children. Among them were the son Gunnar Christian Brøvig, who took over Tharald's company and was the father of Tharald Brøvig Jr. but died during the Second World War, and the son Harald Nikolai Brøvig, a politician. Their daughter Andrea Brøvig married Olav Selvaag.

== Career ==
He finished his secondary education in 1896, and took the cand.jur. degree in 1901. He studied for one year in London, but then returned to Norway and Farsund. He worked as an attorney from 1902, and also edited the conservative newspaper Farsunds Avis from 1902 to 1916. He was a vice consul for Sweden in Farsund from 1911, represented the Conservative Party on the municipal council of Farsund Municipality from 1911, and quit as an attorney and editor after he was elected mayor of Farsund Municipality in 1915.

He also became involved in shipping, together with his father. In 1906 the name Th. Brøvig was registered as a shipping company. He took over his father's business in 1915. The sailing ships were gradually replaced with steam ships. By 1938 Th. Brøvig owned ten dry cargo ships, five tankers and was contracted to another tanker, and had become the largest ship-owning company in Southern Norway. He was also a board member of the Norwegian Shipowners' Association from 1913 to 1938, and a supervisory council member of Det Norske Veritas.

He was decorated as a Knight of the Order of Vasa, and in 1937 as a Knight, First Class of the Order of St. Olav. He died in August 1938 while visiting Oslo. The company name Th. Brøvig still exists, but the parent company is named Gezina.
