= Vestbygd, Agder =

Village in Farsund Municipality, Norway

Vestbygd Borhaug
- Village
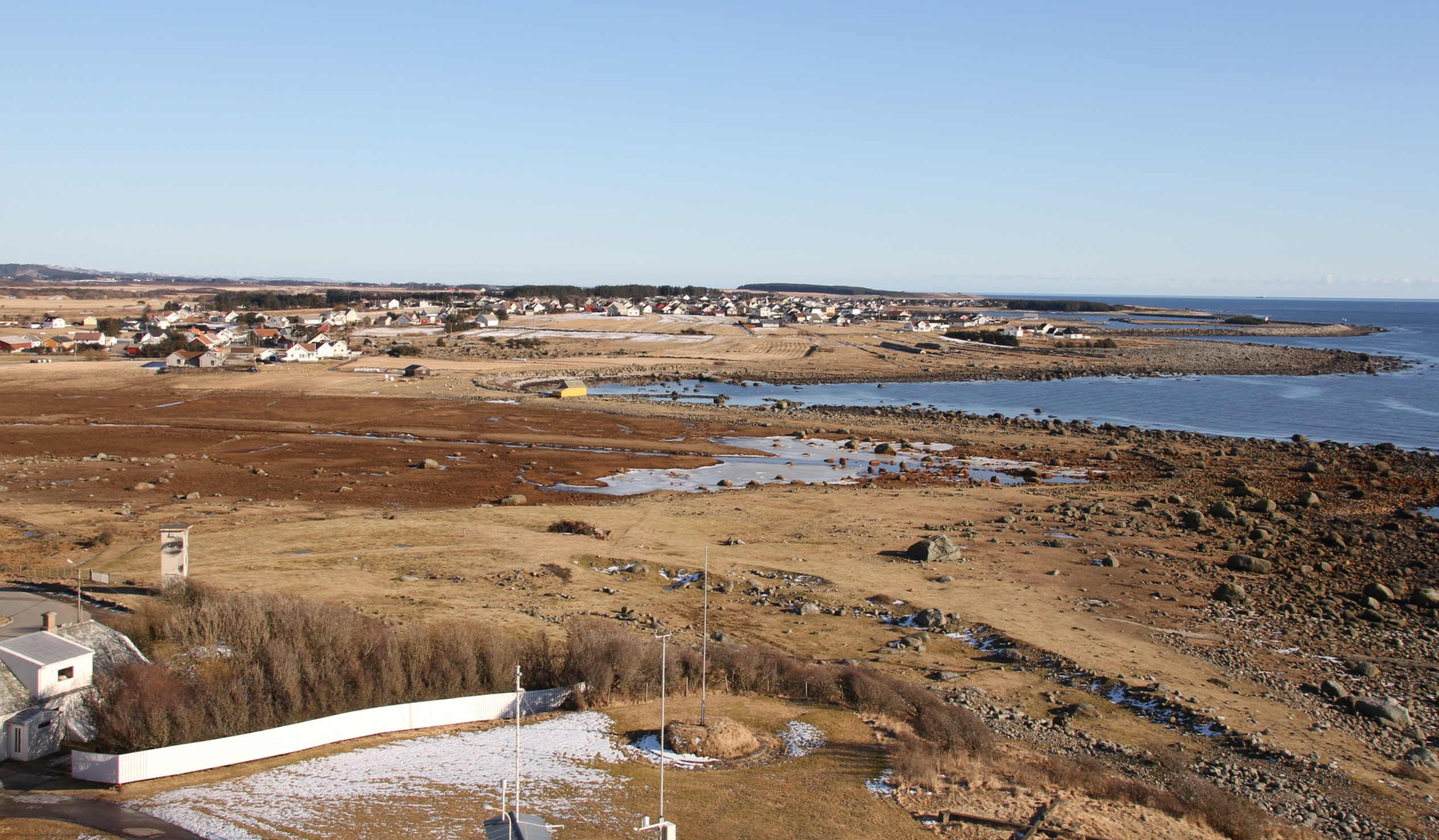
- View of the village
- Interactive map of Vestbygd
- Coordinates: 58.09991°N 6.58696°E
- Country: Norway
- Region: Southern Norway
- County: Agder
- District: Lister
- Municipality: Farsund Municipality

Area
  - Total: 0.93 km^{2} (0.36 sq mi)
- Elevation: 8 m (26 ft)

Population (2026)
  - Total: 1,136
  - Density: 1,222/km^{2} (3,160/sq mi)
- Time zone: UTC+01:00 (CET)
  - Summer (DST): UTC+02:00 (CEST)
- Post Code: 4563 Borhaug

Vestbygd or Borhaug is a village in Farsund Municipality in Agder county, Norway. The village is located on the southwestern shore of the Lista peninsula, about 6 kilometres (3.7 mi) straight west of the village of Vanse. The Farsund Airport, Lista is located on the east side of Vestbygd. The Lista Lighthouse lies just west of the village. The village has a small harbour, surrounded by a breakwater which protects it from the open North Sea. Vestbygda Chapel is located in the village. The fishing village once had a thriving boatbuilding business, but that is now closed.

The 0.93-square-kilometre (230-acre) village has a population (2026) of 1,136 which gives the village a population density of 1,222 inhabitants per square kilometre (3,160/sq mi).

== Climate ==
Climate data for Lista Lighthouse in Farsund 1991-2020 (14 m)
Month	Jan	Feb	Mar	Apr	May	Jun	Jul	Aug	Sep	Oct	Nov	Dec	Year
Mean daily maximum °C (°F)	4.5 (40.1)	3.9 (39.0)	5.3 (41.5)	9 (48)	12.6 (54.7)	15.3 (59.5)	17.9 (64.2)	18.5 (65.3)	15.7 (60.3)	11.5 (52.7)	7.8 (46.0)	5.4 (41.7)	10.6 (51.1)
Daily mean °C (°F)	2.7 (36.9)	1.9 (35.4)	3.2 (37.8)	6.2 (43.2)	9.8 (49.6)	12.7 (54.9)	15.4 (59.7)	15.9 (60.6)	13.3 (55.9)	9.4 (48.9)	6 (43)	3.7 (38.7)	8.4 (47.1)
Mean daily minimum °C (°F)	0.6 (33.1)	0 (32)	1.2 (34.2)	3.7 (38.7)	7.2 (45.0)	10.3 (50.5)	12.9 (55.2)	13.3 (55.9)	11 (52)	7.1 (44.8)	3.9 (39.0)	1.3 (34.3)	6.0 (42.9)
Average precipitation mm (inches)	127.1 (5.00)	89.9 (3.54)	87.7 (3.45)	63.3 (2.49)	61.1 (2.41)	62.9 (2.48)	81.1 (3.19)	106 (4.2)	116 (4.6)	142.7 (5.62)	129.2 (5.09)	128.2 (5.05)	1,195.2 (47.12)
Average precipitation days (≥ 1 mm)	16	15	13	10	10	9	11	12	13	15	16	16	156
Source 1: Norwegian Meteorological Institute
Source 2: NOAA - WMO averages 91-2020 Norway
