= Lista (peninsula) =

Peninsula in Agder, Norway

- Peninsula
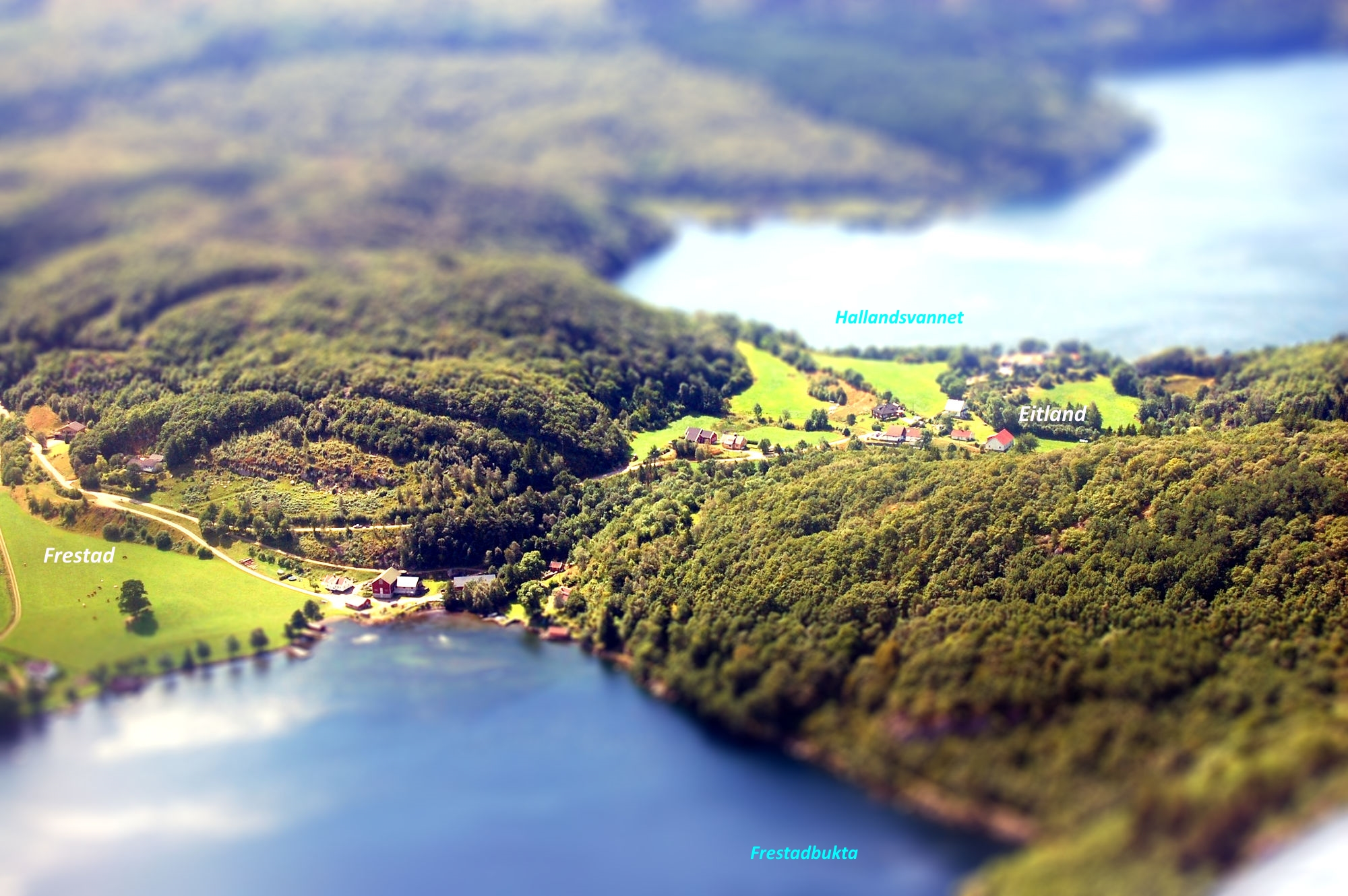
- View of the Frestad area
- Interactive map of Lista
- Coordinates: 58.09444°N 6.60199°E
- Location: Agder, Norway
- Water bodies: Listafjorden, Lyngdalsfjorden, North Sea

Lista is a large peninsula in Farsund Municipality in Agder county, Norway. It is located between the Listafjorden in the west and Lyngdalsfjorden in the east. The peninsula is connected to the mainland in the north by the 1.3-kilometre (0.81 mi) wide Listeidet isthmus between Framvaren and Eidsfjorden, an east-going arm of the Listafjorden. The peninsula had 8581 inhabitants in 2019. On Lista are the three main urban settlements (counting from the west): Vestbygd, Vanse, and the town of Farsund. The beach resort Loshavn is located on the southeastern coast of Lista.

The landscape of Lista is divided in two. The 3-to-4-kilometre (1.9 to 2.5 mi) wide coastal plain is quite flat heathland and similar to the nearby Jæren district. Then moving inland, there is a large moraine that marks the start of a more rugged, rocky terrain, reaching the highest point at the 346-metre (1,135 ft) tall mountain Storfjellet. Farsund Airport, Lista is located on the peninsula, but it has not had any regularly scheduled commercial flights since 1999; however, there are discussions to use it as a base for offshore operations. There is also the Lista Lighthouse which is located just off-shore, which for a time was the world's largest.

== History ==
A number of finds from the Stone Age and later archaeological periods have been found at Lista, and Lista is often mentioned in the old Norse sagas. At the archaeological site, Penne, there is a rich field of petroglyphs.

Historically, the peninsula and surrounding area were referred to as Lister. Due to this area's historical importance, it was part of the namesake of the whole Lister Region and it was the old name of Vest-Agder county, being called Lister og Mandals Amt until 1919. The peninsula was the site of the old Lista Municipality until its dissolution in 1965.
