= Frelseren Church =

Church in Agder, Norway

- Frelserens kirke
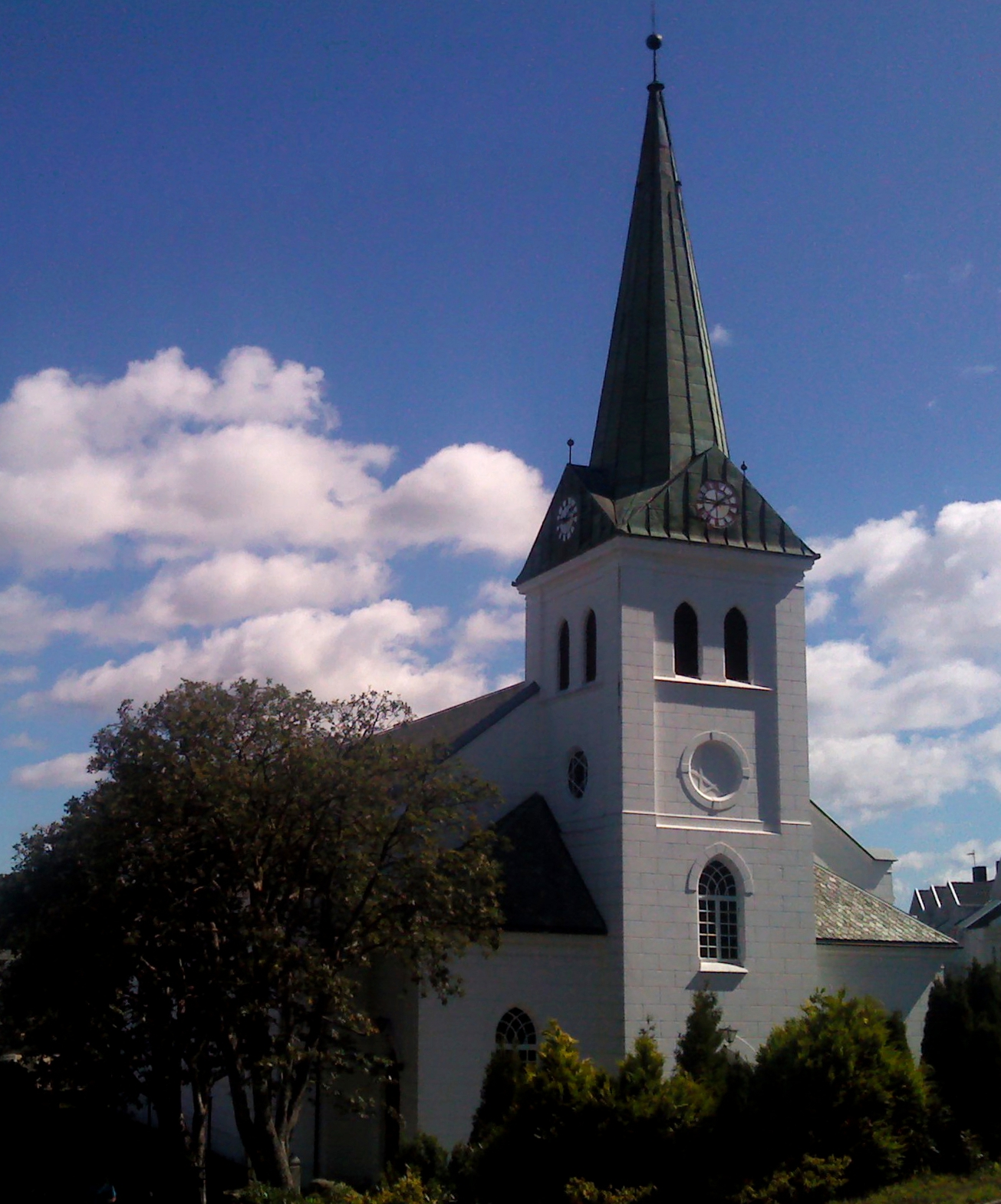
- View of the church
- Frelseren Church
- 58.0943°N 06.8015°E
- Location: Farsund Municipality, Agder
- Country: Norway
- Denomination: Church of Norway
- Churchmanship: Evangelical Lutheran

History
- Status: Parish church
- Founded: 1785
- Consecrated: 1905

Architecture
- Functional status: Active
- Architect: George Johnstone
- Architectural type: Rectangular
- Completed: 1905; 121 years ago

Specifications
- Capacity: 380
- Materials: Stone

Administration
- Diocese: Agder og Telemark
- Deanery: Lister og Mandal prosti
- Parish: Farsund
- Norwegian Cultural Heritage Site
- Type: Church
- Status: Not protected
- ID: 84117

Frelseren Church (lit. 'The Saviour's Church'; Norwegian: Frelserens kirke) is a parish church of the Church of Norway in Farsund Municipality in Agder county, Norway. It is located in the town of Farsund. It is one of the three churches for the Farsund parish which is part of the Lister og Mandal prosti (deanery) in the Diocese of Agder og Telemark. The white, stone church was built in a rectangular design in 1905 using plans drawn up in 1785 (for the previous church) by the architect George Johnstone from Scotland. The church seats about 380 people.

== History ==
The stone church was founded in 1785 to serve the growing town of Farsund. The church is a rectangular church with the nave and choir in the same room. In 1901, the church burned down and only the exterior stone walls remained. In 1905, the church was rebuilt using what remained of the old exterior walls, but with a completely new interior. The only items from the interior that were saved from the fire was the baptismal font and a chandelier that had hung over the aisle.

== Media gallery ==
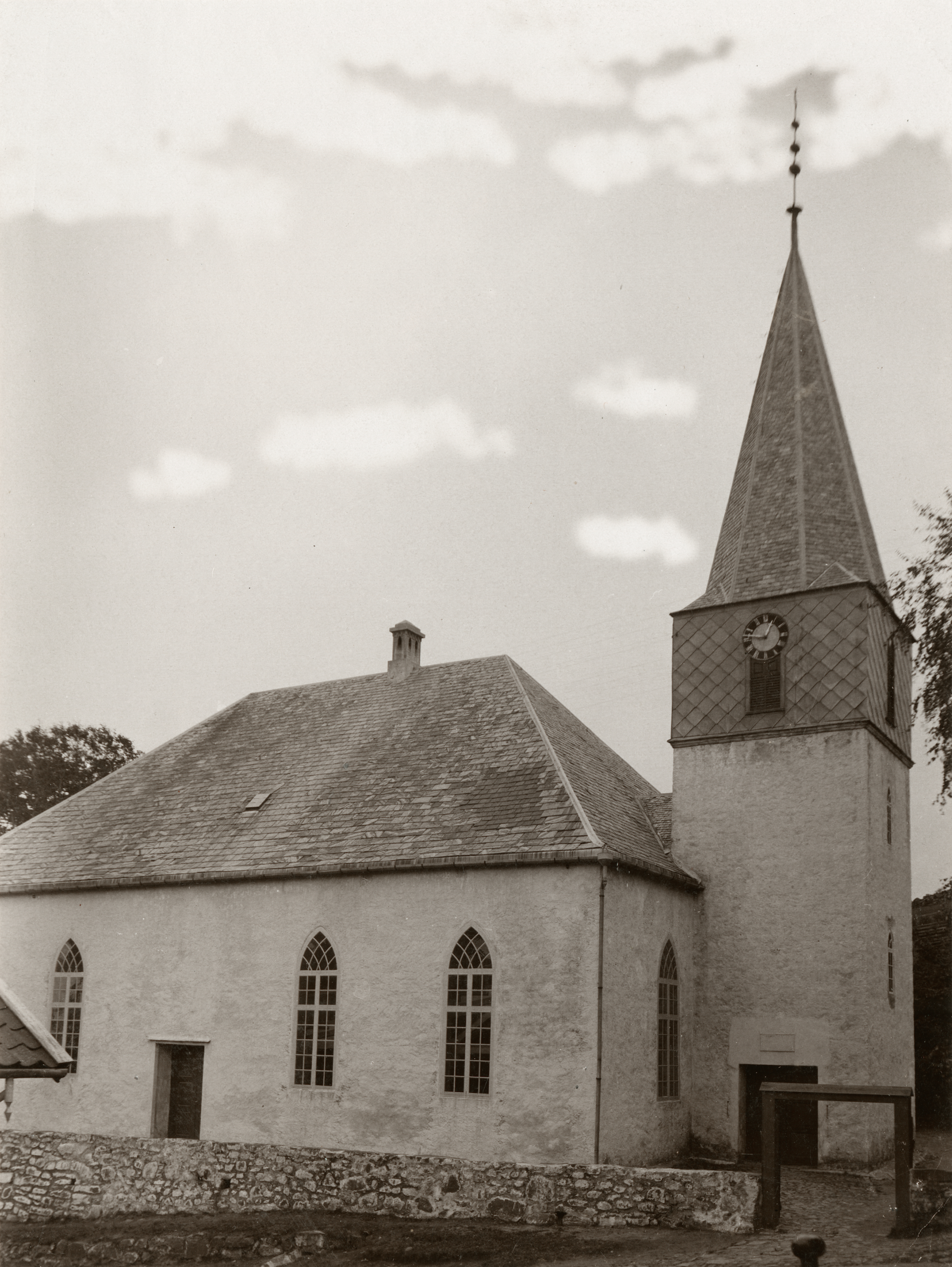
View of the church around the year 1900 (before the fire)

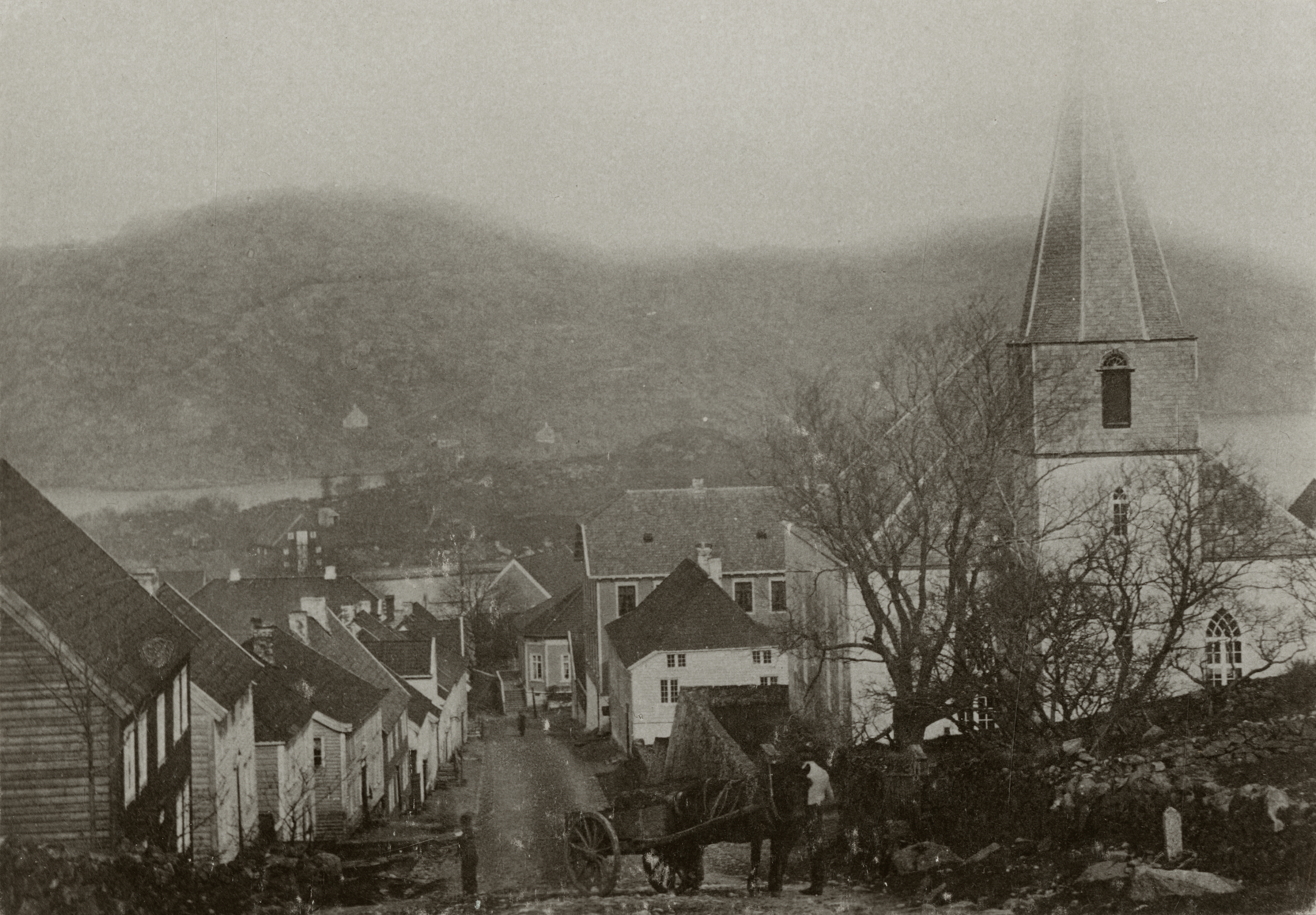
View of the church around the year 1900 (before the fire)

== See also ==
- List of churches in Agder og Telemark
