= Ove Rullestad =

Norwegian politician (1940–2023)

Ove Rullestad (10 March 1940 – 26 October 2023) was a Norwegian politician for the Conservative Party.

== Biography ==
Rullestad served as a deputy representative to the Norwegian Parliament from Vest-Agder during the term 1997–2001. On the local level he was the mayor of Farsund Municipality from 1991 to 2003. Rullestad died on 26 October 2023, at the age of 83.
