= Spind Church =

Church in Agder, Norway

- Spind kirke
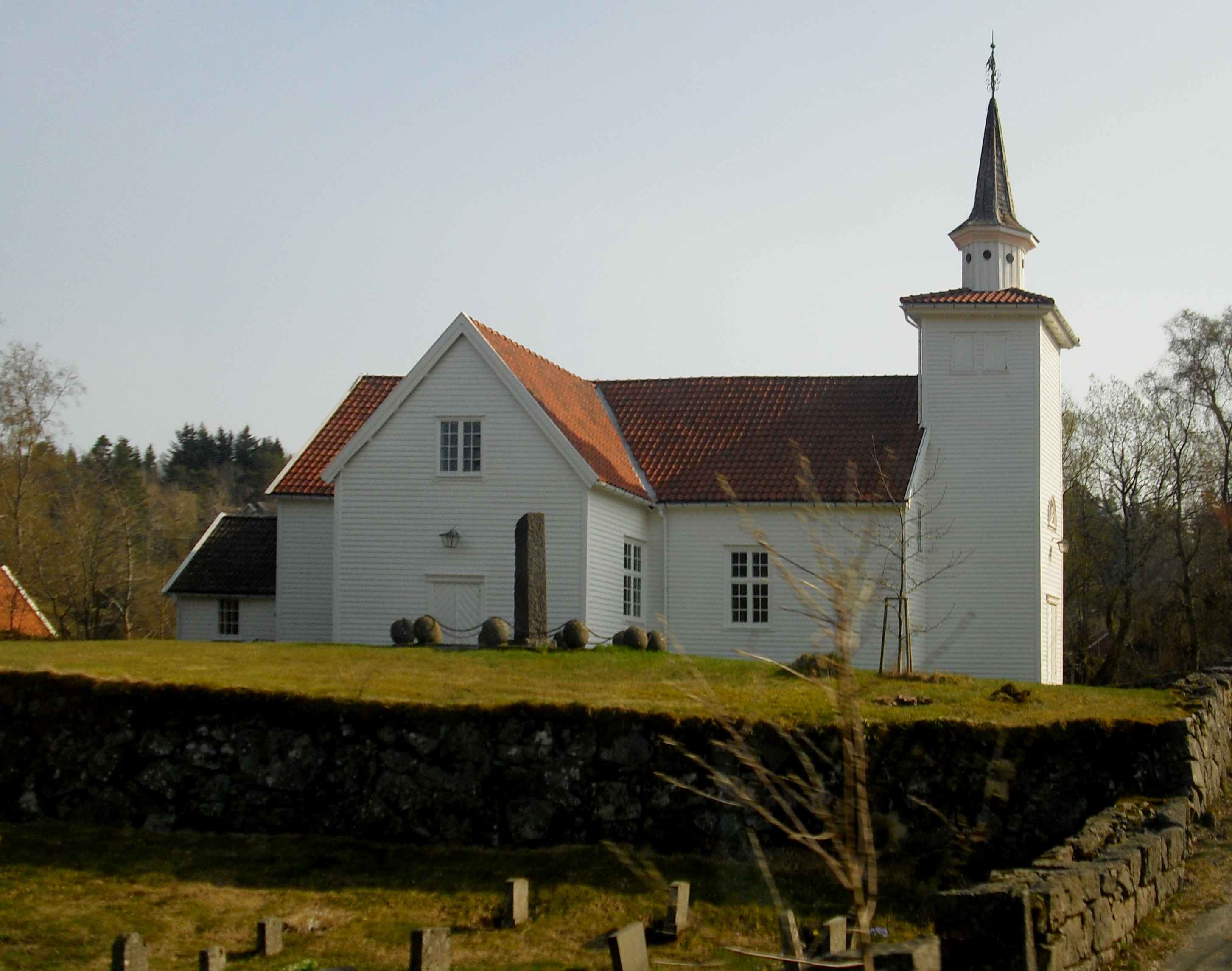
- View of the church
- Spind Church
- 58.0931°N 06.9018°E
- Location: Farsund Municipality, Agder
- Country: Norway
- Denomination: Church of Norway
- Previous denomination: Catholic Church
- Churchmanship: Evangelical Lutheran

History
- Status: Parish church
- Founded: 13th century
- Consecrated: 1776

Architecture
- Functional status: Active
- Architect: Lars Albertsen Øvrenes
- Architectural type: Cruciform
- Completed: 1776; 250 years ago

Specifications
- Capacity: 500
- Materials: Wood

Administration
- Diocese: Agder og Telemark
- Deanery: Lister og Mandal prosti
- Parish: Farsund
- Norwegian Cultural Heritage Site
- Type: Church
- Status: Automatically protected
- ID: 85530

Spind Church (Norwegian: Spind kirke) is a parish church of the Church of Norway in Farsund Municipality in Agder county, Norway. It is located in the village of Rødland in the area to the east of the town of Farsund. It is one of the three churches for the Farsund parish which is part of the Lister og Mandal prosti (deanery) in the Diocese of Agder og Telemark. The white, wooden church was built in a cruciform design in 1776 using plans drawn up by the architect Lars Albertsen Øvrenes. The church seats about 500 people.

== History ==
The earliest existing historical records of the church date back to the year 1328, but the old stave church was likely built during the 1200s. Not much is known about the old church, but it is known that in 1776 a new church was built on higher ground about 20 metres (66 ft) to the west of the old church. After the new church was completed, the old medieval church was torn down. Historically, this was the main church for the old Spind Municipality.

== See also ==
- List of churches in Agder og Telemark
