= Thorald =

Thorald is a given name. Notable people with the name include:

- Thorald Brendstrup, Danish painter
- Thorald Jerichau, Danish organist and composer
- Thorald Læssøe, Danish landscape painter
- Hans-Thorald Michaelis, German historian, germanist and genealogist

== See also ==
- Thorald's House, Aarhus, Denmark
- Thorvald
- Tarald
