= Microsoft Live Labs Listas =

Listas
- Developer(s): Microsoft
- Preview release: Beta / October 17, 2007
- Type: Lists management
- Website: listas.labs.live.com

Listas was a tool for the creation, management and sharing of lists, notes, and favorites, being developed at Microsoft Live labs. It allowed users to quickly and easily edit lists, share them with others for reading or wiki-style editing, and discover the public lists of other users.

The Listas Community section allowed users to find highlights of the most popular lists from around the community of public lists, such as the most used tags, the "hottest lists", and prolific contributors. Users were able to add another user's lists or RSS feed to their own Listas to keep them up to date.

Listas has since been retired as a project from Live Labs.

== Listas Toolbar ==
Listas Toolbar was an internet toolbar for Internet Explorer that allowed users to create lists from search results, wish lists, videos, or all or part of virtually any page that can be found on the web.

== See also ==
- Windows Live
