= Lista Lighthouse =

Coastal lighthouse in Farsund, Norway

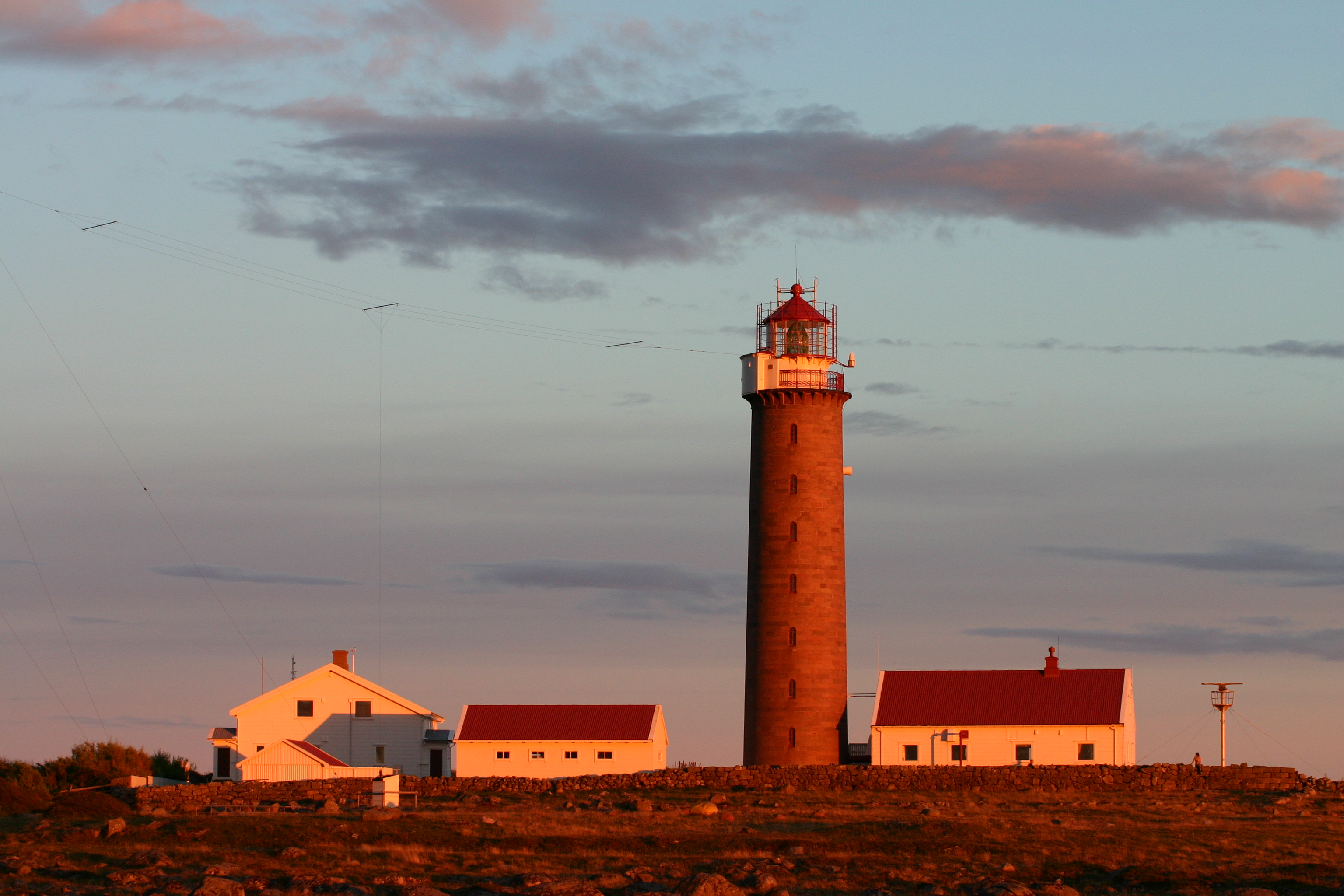
- View of the lighthouse
- Location: Agder, Norway
- Coordinates: 58°06′33″N 06°34′00″E

Tower
- Constructed: 1853 (current)
- Construction: Granite tower
- Automated: 2003
- Height: 34 metres (112 ft)
- Shape: Round
- Markings: Unpainted stone with red and white top
- Operator: Lista Fyr
- Heritage: cultural heritage preservation in Norway
- Racon: Morse code "G"

Light
- First lit: 1836 (first)
- Focal height: 39.5 metres (130 ft)
- Intensity: 1,026,000 candela
- Range: 17.5 nmi (32.4 km; 20.1 mi)
- Characteristic: Fl W 4s
- Norway no.: 086500

Lista Lighthouse (Norwegian: Lista fyr) is a coastal lighthouse located at the western side of the Lista peninsula, a short distance northwest of the village of Vestbygd in Farsund Municipality in Agder county, Norway. The lighthouse sits on a cape on the edge of the Listafjorden which marks the extreme southwestern edge of the mainland of Norway. The lighthouse had a foghorn that was used from 1877 until 1987. In 1937, the station began emitting a racon signal of the morse code letter "G".

The 34-metre (112 ft) tall unpainted granite tower was first lit in 1836, but it was rebuilt in 1853. The light sits at an elevation of 39.5 metres (130 ft) and it emits a white flash of light every four seconds. The 1,026,000-candela light can be seen in all directions for up to 17.5 nautical miles (32.4 km; 20.1 mi).

In 2003, the station was automated and the buildings were turned over to Vest-Agder county. The site is now used as a museum that is open daily during the summer months.

== Media gallery ==
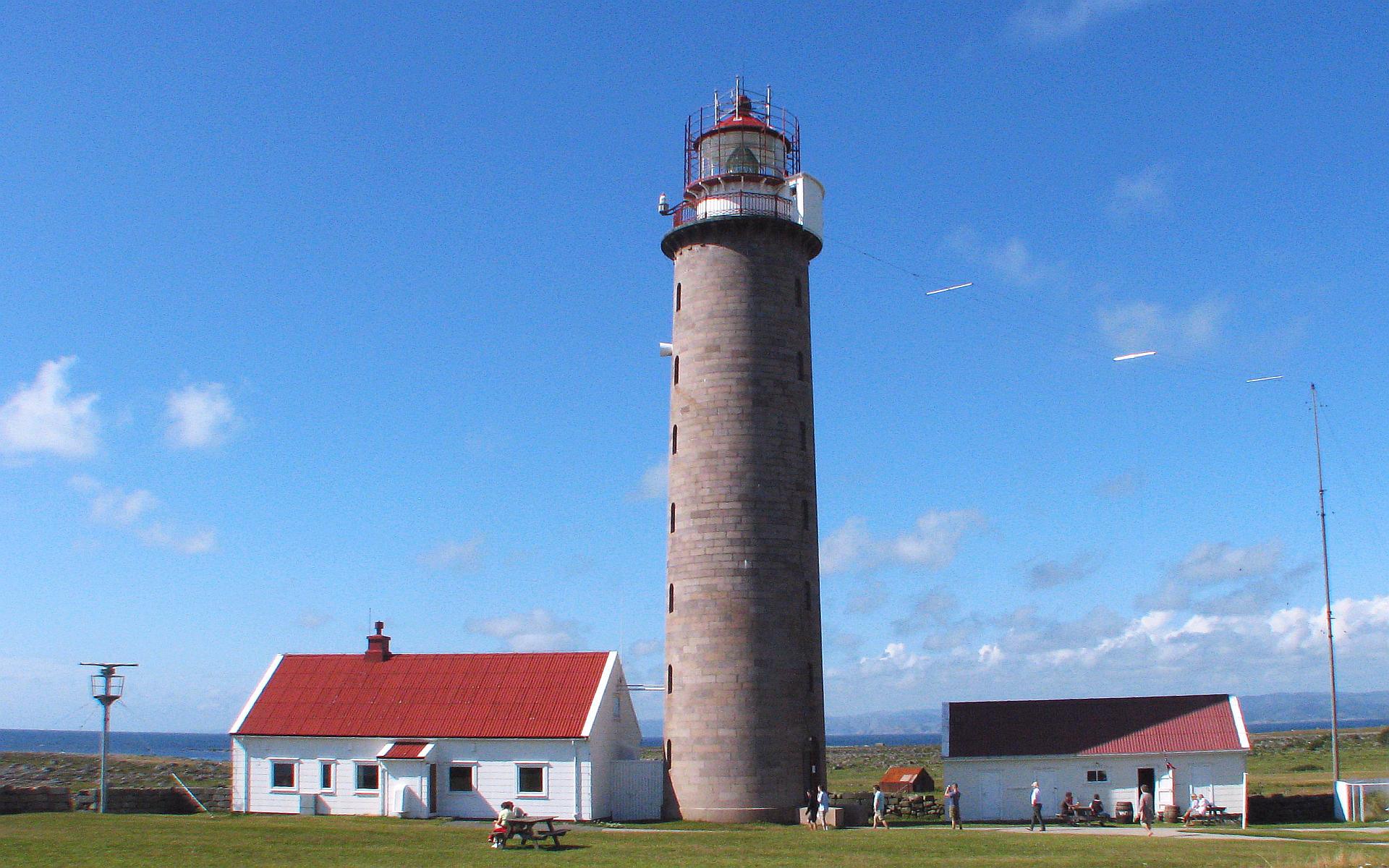
Lighthouse "Lista Fyr" built 1836 with a 34 m granite tower

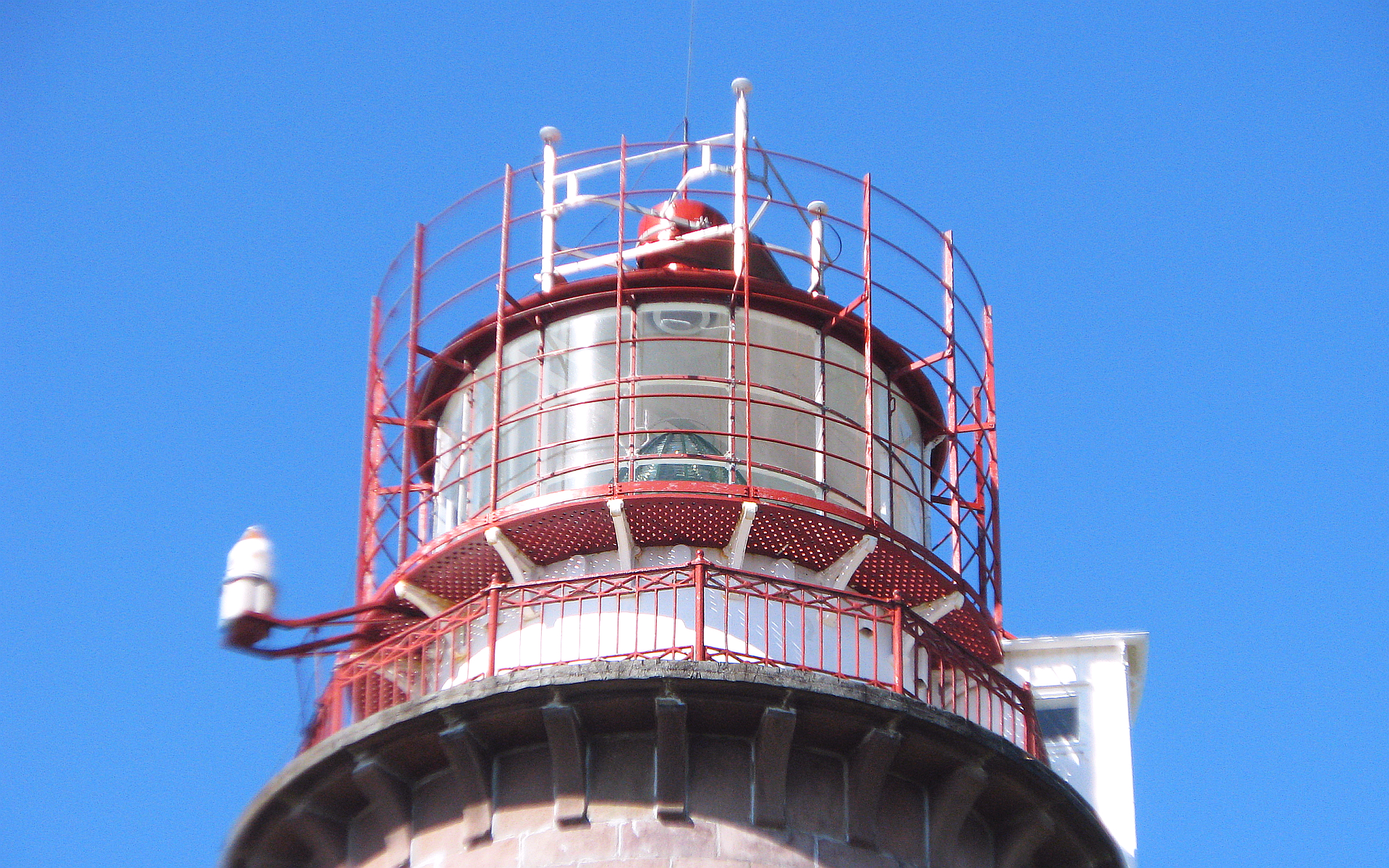
Lighthouse lantern in a height of 39 m reaching 17 nautical miles

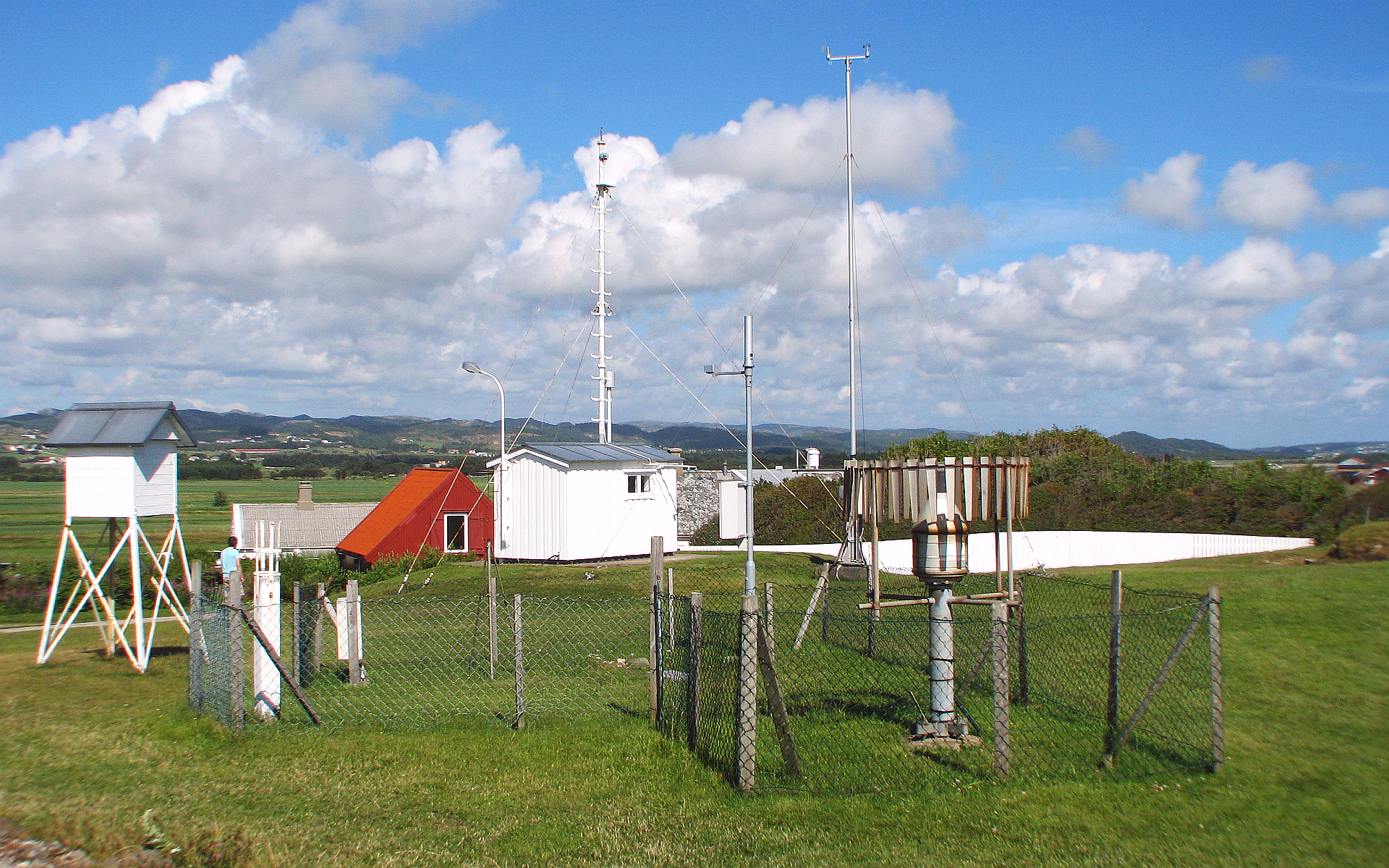
Weather station near the lighthouse

== Climate ==
Climate data for Lista Lighthouse in Farsund 1991-2020 (14 m)
Month	Jan	Feb	Mar	Apr	May	Jun	Jul	Aug	Sep	Oct	Nov	Dec	Year
Mean daily maximum °C (°F)	4.5 (40.1)	3.9 (39.0)	5.3 (41.5)	9 (48)	12.6 (54.7)	15.3 (59.5)	17.9 (64.2)	18.5 (65.3)	15.7 (60.3)	11.5 (52.7)	7.8 (46.0)	5.4 (41.7)	10.6 (51.1)
Daily mean °C (°F)	2.7 (36.9)	1.9 (35.4)	3.2 (37.8)	6.2 (43.2)	9.8 (49.6)	12.7 (54.9)	15.4 (59.7)	15.9 (60.6)	13.3 (55.9)	9.4 (48.9)	6 (43)	3.7 (38.7)	8.4 (47.1)
Mean daily minimum °C (°F)	0.6 (33.1)	0 (32)	1.2 (34.2)	3.7 (38.7)	7.2 (45.0)	10.3 (50.5)	12.9 (55.2)	13.3 (55.9)	11 (52)	7.1 (44.8)	3.9 (39.0)	1.3 (34.3)	6.0 (42.9)
Average precipitation mm (inches)	127.1 (5.00)	89.9 (3.54)	87.7 (3.45)	63.3 (2.49)	61.1 (2.41)	62.9 (2.48)	81.1 (3.19)	106 (4.2)	116 (4.6)	142.7 (5.62)	129.2 (5.09)	128.2 (5.05)	1,195.2 (47.12)
Average precipitation days (≥ 1 mm)	16	15	13	10	10	9	11	12	13	15	16	16	156
Source 1: Norwegian Meteorological Institute
Source 2: NOAA - WMO averages 91-2020 Norway

== See also ==
- Lighthouses in Norway
- List of lighthouses in Norway
