= Farsund Municipality =

Municipality in Agder, Norway

Farsund Municipality Farsund kommune
- Municipality
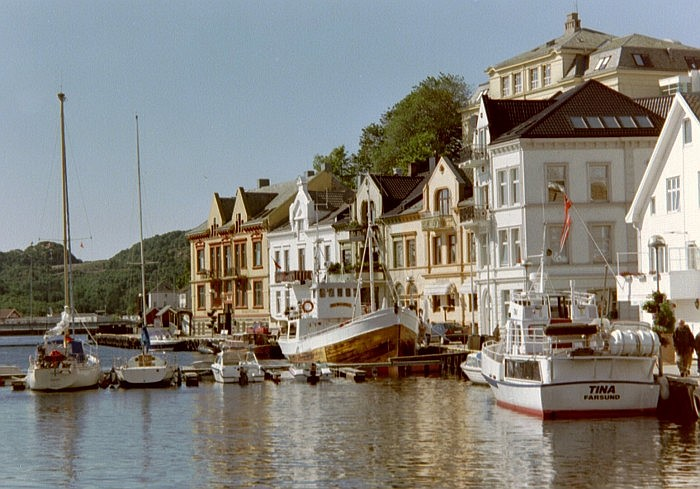
- View of the Farsund town harbour

- Coat of arms

- Agder within Norway

- Farsund within Agder
- Coordinates: 58°04′58″N 06°45′10″E
- Country: Norway
- County: Agder
- District: Lister
- Established: 1 Jan 1838
  - Created as: Formannskapsdistrikt
- Administrative centre: Farsund

Government
  - Mayor (2023): Ingrid Williamsen (FrP)

Area
  - Total: 262.58 km^{2} (101.38 sq mi)
  - Land: 251.76 km^{2} (97.21 sq mi)
  - Water: 10.82 km^{2} (4.18 sq mi) 4.1%
  - Rank: #276 in Norway
- Highest elevation: 487.23 m (1,598.5 ft)

Population (2026)
  - Total: 9,949
  - Rank: #113 in Norway
  - Density: 39.5/km^{2} (102/sq mi)
  - Change (10 years): ▲ +2.5%
- Demonym(s): Farsunder or Farsundar (also: Listelending or Listring)

Official language
  - Norwegian form: Bokmål
- Time zone: UTC+01:00 (CET)
  - Summer (DST): UTC+02:00 (CEST)
- ISO 3166 code: NO-4206
- Website: Official website

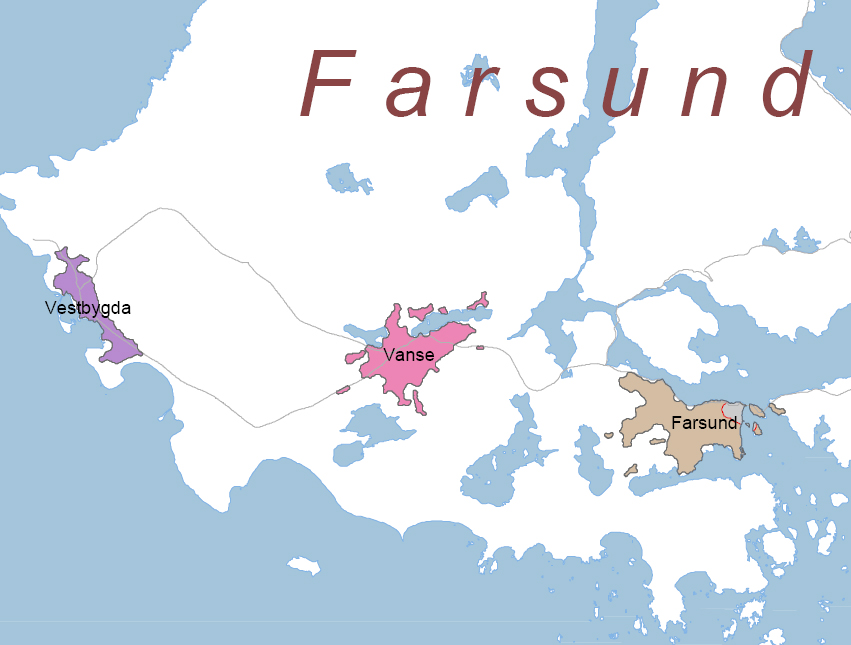
Map of urban areas in Farsund

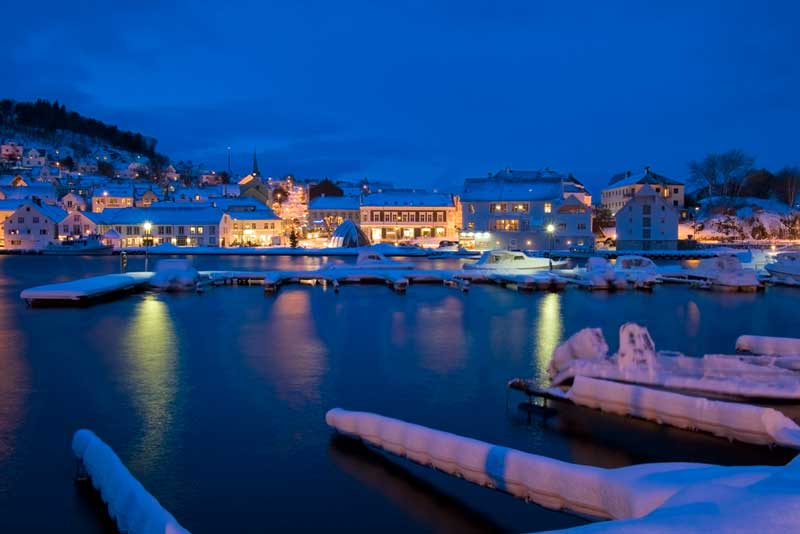
View of the town of Farsund

Farsund (Norwegian: ['fɑːʂʉn]) is a municipality in Agder county, Norway. It is located in the traditional district of Lister. The administrative centre of the municipality is the town of Farsund.

The 262.58-square-kilometre (101.38 sq mi) municipality is the 276th largest by area out of the 357 municipalities in Norway. Farsund Municipality is the 113th most populous municipality in Norway with a population of 9,949. The municipality's population density is 39.5 inhabitants per square kilometre (102/sq mi) and its population has increased by 2.5% over the previous 10-year period.

The inhabitants of Farsund are concentrated in three centres of population: the town of Farsund (population: 3,531), Vanse (population: 2,075), and Vestbygda (population: 1,136). Loshavn with its wooden buildings is located outside the town of Farsund. Other villages in Farsund include Ore, Rødland, and Sande.

== Name ==
The municipality (originally the parish) is named after the Farsundet strait, a narrow strait through which the Lyngdalsfjorden passes as it goes by the town of Farsund. The first element of the name comes from the small island of Farøy which sits in the Farsund strait. The name of the island comes from the word far which means "travel" or "journey" (similar to the English word farewell meaning "good journey"). The last element is sund which means "strait" or "sound".

== Coat of arms ==
The coat of arms has been used since 1900 or 1901. The blazon is "Or, a mount surmounted by four linden trees vert". This means the arms have a field (background) has a tincture of Or which means it is commonly colored yellow, but if it is made out of metal, then gold is used. The charge is a group of linden trees on a green hill. This design was chosen to represent the town of Farsund since there were four old linden trees on the town square. Originally, these trees grew in the garden of the Lund merchant dynasty, where they were probably planted in the middle of the 18th century. The trees also appear in the trade seal of the family. In 1957, the old trees were removed and replaced with new ones. The municipal flag has the same design as the coat of arms.

== History ==
There is evidence of settlement in Farsund and Lista since the Stone Age.

Farsund held a strategic location in the Atlantic wall during World War II, with the Lundebanen and over 400 bunkers built in Farsund municipality, many that can be visited. Between 1940 and 1945, large Soviet prison camps were located at Lista, with prison camps at Kåde and Ore holding over 600 prisoners. The Soviet prisoners were used as forced labour to build Farsund Airport, bunkers, barracks, and fortifications .

The town of Farsund previously had a hospital, Farsund Hospital, which was closed down in 2007.

=== Municipal border ===
The town of Farsund was established as a municipality on 1 January 1838 (see formannskapsdistrikt law), although it was already recognized as a ladested (trading port) in 1795. The small town existed on its own for many years. On 1 January 1903, a small area in the neighboring Vanse Municipality (population: 99), located just outside the town of Farsund, was transferred into the town. Again, in 1948 another small area from the neighboring Lista Municipality (population: 64) was transferred into the town of Farsund.

During the 1960s, there were many municipal mergers across Norway due to the work of the Schei Committee. On 1 January 1965, the following areas were merged to form an enlarged Farsund Municipality:

- the town of Farsund (population: 2,208)
- all of Herad Municipality (population: 359)
- all of Lista Municipality (population: 4,544)
- all of Spind Municipality (population: 606)

On 1 January 1971, the Ytre og Indre Skarstein farms (population: 21) located along the western shore of the Rosfjorden were transferred from Lyngdal Municipality to Farsund Municipality.

Historically, this municipality was part of the old Vest-Agder county. On 1 January 2020, the municipality became a part of the newly-formed Agder county (after Aust-Agder and Vest-Agder counties were merged).

== Government ==
Farsund Municipality is responsible for primary education (through 10th grade), outpatient health services, senior citizen services, welfare and other social services, zoning, economic development, and municipal roads and utilities. The municipality is governed by a municipal council of directly elected representatives. The mayor is indirectly elected by a vote of the municipal council. The municipality is under the jurisdiction of the Agder District Court and the Agder Court of Appeal.

=== Municipal council ===
The municipal council (Kommunestyre) of Farsund Municipality is made up of 29 representatives that are elected to four year terms. The tables below show the current and historical composition of the council by political party.

Farsund kommunestyre 2023–2027
Party name (in Norwegian)	Number of representatives
Labour Party (Arbeiderpartiet)	5
Progress Party (Fremskrittspartiet)	10
Conservative Party (Høyre)	4
Industry and Business Party (Industri‑ og Næringspartiet)	1
Christian Democratic Party (Kristelig Folkeparti)	4
Centre Party (Senterpartiet)	2
Socialist Left Party (Sosialistisk Venstreparti)	2
Liberal Party (Venstre)	1
Total number of members:	29

Farsund kommunestyre 2019–2023
Party name (in Norwegian)	Number of representatives
Labour Party (Arbeiderpartiet)	8
Progress Party (Fremskrittspartiet)	6
Conservative Party (Høyre)	4
Christian Democratic Party (Kristelig Folkeparti)	5
Red Party (Rødt)	1
Centre Party (Senterpartiet)	3
Socialist Left Party (Sosialistisk Venstreparti)	1
Liberal Party (Venstre)	1
Total number of members:	29

Farsund kommunestyre 2015–2019
Party name (in Norwegian)	Number of representatives
Labour Party (Arbeiderpartiet)	6
Progress Party (Fremskrittspartiet)	6
Conservative Party (Høyre)	6
Christian Democratic Party (Kristelig Folkeparti)	5
Pensioners' Party (Pensjonistpartiet)	1
Centre Party (Senterpartiet)	2
Socialist Left Party (Sosialistisk Venstreparti)	1
Liberal Party (Venstre)	2
Total number of members:	29

Farsund kommunestyre 2011–2015
Party name (in Norwegian)	Number of representatives
Labour Party (Arbeiderpartiet)	4
Progress Party (Fremskrittspartiet)	10
Conservative Party (Høyre)	6
Christian Democratic Party (Kristelig Folkeparti)	4
Pensioners' Party (Pensjonistpartiet)	1
Centre Party (Senterpartiet)	1
Socialist Left Party (Sosialistisk Venstreparti)	1
Liberal Party (Venstre)	2
Total number of members:	29

Farsund kommunestyre 2007–2011
Party name (in Norwegian)	Number of representatives
Labour Party (Arbeiderpartiet)	7
Progress Party (Fremskrittspartiet)	9
Conservative Party (Høyre)	5
Christian Democratic Party (Kristelig Folkeparti)	5
Centre Party (Senterpartiet)	1
Socialist Left Party (Sosialistisk Venstreparti)	2
Total number of members:	29

Farsund kommunestyre 2003–2007
Party name (in Norwegian)	Number of representatives
Labour Party (Arbeiderpartiet)	5
Progress Party (Fremskrittspartiet)	6
Conservative Party (Høyre)	6
Christian Democratic Party (Kristelig Folkeparti)	5
Centre Party (Senterpartiet)	2
Socialist Left Party (Sosialistisk Venstreparti)	3
Liberal Party (Venstre)	2
Total number of members:	29

Farsund kommunestyre 1999–2003
Party name (in Norwegian)	Number of representatives
Labour Party (Arbeiderpartiet)	4
Progress Party (Fremskrittspartiet)	6
Conservative Party (Høyre)	10
Christian Democratic Party (Kristelig Folkeparti)	5
Centre Party (Senterpartiet)	1
Socialist Left Party (Sosialistisk Venstreparti)	2
Liberal Party (Venstre)	1
Total number of members:	29

Farsund kommunestyre 1995–1999
Party name (in Norwegian)	Number of representatives
Labour Party (Arbeiderpartiet)	3
Progress Party (Fremskrittspartiet)	6
Conservative Party (Høyre)	11
Christian Democratic Party (Kristelig Folkeparti)	5
Centre Party (Senterpartiet)	2
Socialist Left Party (Sosialistisk Venstreparti)	1
Liberal Party (Venstre)	1
Total number of members:	29

Farsund kommunestyre 1991–1995
Party name (in Norwegian)	Number of representatives
Labour Party (Arbeiderpartiet)	5
Progress Party (Fremskrittspartiet)	6
Conservative Party (Høyre)	8
Christian Democratic Party (Kristelig Folkeparti)	5
Centre Party (Senterpartiet)	2
Socialist Left Party (Sosialistisk Venstreparti)	1
Liberal Party (Venstre)	1
Cross-party list (Tverrpolitisk liste)	1
Total number of members:	29

Farsund kommunestyre 1987–1991
Party name (in Norwegian)	Number of representatives
Labour Party (Arbeiderpartiet)	9
Progress Party (Fremskrittspartiet)	8
Conservative Party (Høyre)	12
Christian Democratic Party (Kristelig Folkeparti)	10
Centre Party (Senterpartiet)	1
Socialist Left Party (Sosialistisk Venstreparti)	1
Liberal Party (Venstre)	3
Non-party list (Upolitisk liste)	1
Total number of members:	45

Farsund kommunestyre 1983–1987
Party name (in Norwegian)	Number of representatives
Labour Party (Arbeiderpartiet)	11
Progress Party (Fremskrittspartiet)	4
Conservative Party (Høyre)	16
Christian Democratic Party (Kristelig Folkeparti)	8
Centre Party (Senterpartiet)	2
Liberal Party (Venstre)	3
Non-party list (Upolitisk liste)	1
Total number of members:	45

Farsund kommunestyre 1979–1983
Party name (in Norwegian)	Number of representatives
Labour Party (Arbeiderpartiet)	8
Conservative Party (Høyre)	18
Christian Democratic Party (Kristelig Folkeparti)	8
New People's Party (Nye Folkepartiet)	1
Centre Party (Senterpartiet)	3
Socialist Left Party (Sosialistisk Venstreparti)	1
Liberal Party (Venstre)	4
Non-party list (Upolitisk liste)	2
Total number of members:	45

Farsund kommunestyre 1975–1979
Party name (in Norwegian)	Number of representatives
Labour Party (Arbeiderpartiet)	8
Conservative Party (Høyre)	15
Christian Democratic Party (Kristelig Folkeparti)	9
New People's Party (Nye Folkepartiet)	4
Centre Party (Senterpartiet)	3
Socialist Left Party (Sosialistisk Venstreparti)	1
Joint list of the Liberal Party and Non-party list (Fellesliste: Venstre og Upolitisk List)	5
Total number of members:	45

Farsund kommunestyre 1971–1975
Party name (in Norwegian)	Number of representatives
Labour Party (Arbeiderpartiet)	9
Conservative Party (Høyre)	11
Christian Democratic Party (Kristelig Folkeparti)	7
Centre Party (Senterpartiet)	3
Socialist People's Party (Sosialistisk Folkeparti)	1
Liberal Party (Venstre)	12
Local List(s) (Lokale lister)	2
Total number of members:	45

Farsund kommunestyre 1967–1971
Party name (in Norwegian)	Number of representatives
Labour Party (Arbeiderpartiet)	8
Conservative Party (Høyre)	13
Christian Democratic Party (Kristelig Folkeparti)	7
Centre Party (Senterpartiet)	3
Socialist People's Party (Sosialistisk Folkeparti)	1
Liberal Party (Venstre)	13
Total number of members:	45

Farsund bystyre 1963–1967
Party name (in Norwegian)	Number of representatives
Labour Party (Arbeiderpartiet)	5
Conservative Party (Høyre)	8
Christian Democratic Party (Kristelig Folkeparti)	2
Liberal Party (Venstre)	6
Total number of members:	21
Note: On 1 January 1965, Herad Municipality, Lista Municipality, and Spind Municipality were merged into Farsund Municipality.

Farsund bystyre 1959–1963
Party name (in Norwegian)	Number of representatives
Labour Party (Arbeiderpartiet)	4
Conservative Party (Høyre)	8
Christian Democratic Party (Kristelig Folkeparti)	3
Liberal Party (Venstre)	6
Total number of members:	21

Farsund bystyre 1955–1959
Party name (in Norwegian)	Number of representatives
Labour Party (Arbeiderpartiet)	6
Conservative Party (Høyre)	7
Christian Democratic Party (Kristelig Folkeparti)	3
Liberal Party (Venstre)	5
Total number of members:	21

Farsund bystyre 1951–1955
Party name (in Norwegian)	Number of representatives
Labour Party (Arbeiderpartiet)	5
Conservative Party (Høyre)	8
Christian Democratic Party (Kristelig Folkeparti)	1
Liberal Party (Venstre)	6
Total number of members:	20

Farsund bystyre 1947–1951
Party name (in Norwegian)	Number of representatives
Labour Party (Arbeiderpartiet)	4
Conservative Party (Høyre)	8
Christian Democratic Party (Kristelig Folkeparti)	2
Liberal Party (Venstre)	6
Total number of members:	20

Farsund bystyre 1945–1947
Party name (in Norwegian)	Number of representatives
Labour Party (Arbeiderpartiet)	5
Conservative Party (Høyre)	7
Christian Democratic Party (Kristelig Folkeparti)	3
Liberal Party (Venstre)	5
Total number of members:	20

Farsund bystyre 1937–1941*
Party name (in Norwegian)	Number of representatives
Labour Party (Arbeiderpartiet)	2
Conservative Party (Høyre)	11
Liberal Party (Venstre)	7
Total number of members:	20
Note: Due to the German occupation of Norway during World War II, no elections were held for new municipal councils until after the war ended in 1945.

Farsund bystyre 1934–1937
Party name (in Norwegian)	Number of representatives
Labour Party (Arbeiderpartiet)	2
Conservative Party (Høyre)	11
Liberal Party (Venstre)	7
Total number of members:	20

=== Mayors ===
The mayor (Norwegian: ordfører) of Farsund Municipality is the political leader of the municipality and the chairperson of the municipal council. The following people have held this position:

- 1838–1838: Fredrik Christian Thrane Abel
- 1839–1839: Christian Larsen
- 1840–1840: Fredrik Christian Thrane Abel
- 1841–1841: Hans Paludan Smith Bøckman
- 1842–1842: Christian Larsen
- 1843–1843: Johan C. Eliesen
- 1844–1844: Johan Henrik Lund
- 1845–1845: Hans Paludan Eide
- 1846–1846: Fredrik Christian Thrane Abel
- 1847–1847: Hans Paludan Eide
- 1848–1849: Hans Paludan Smith Bøckman
- 1850–1850: Gabriel G. Lund
- 1851–1851: E. Røhl
- 1853–1853: Gottlieb Gundersen
- 1854–1854: E. Røhl
- 1855–1855: Gottlieb Gundersen
- 1856–1856: Hans Paludan Eide
- 1857–1860: Gottlieb Gundersen
- 1861–1861: Sigbjørn Salvesen
- 1862–1862: Gottlieb Gundersen
- 1863–1863: Sigbjørn Salvesen
- 1864–1864: Gottlieb Gundersen
- 1865–1865: Sigbjørn Salvesen
- 1866–1868: Gottlieb Gundersen
- 1869–1869: Sigbjørn Salvesen
- 1870–1870: Fredrik Adam Otto
- 1871–1873: Peter Sundt
- 1874–1874: Theodor August Overwien
- 1875–1875: Severin Jahnsen
- 1876–1876: Theodor August Overwien
- 1877–1877: Peter Severin Pedersen
- 1878–1878: Adolf Julius Wichstrøm
- 1879–1879: Peter Severin Pedersen
- 1880–1880: Peter Sundt
- 1881–1881: Peter Severin Pedersen
- 1882–1882: Severin Abrahamsen
- 1883–1884: Fredrik Julius Kloumann
- 1885–1895: Peter Severin Pedersen
- 1896–1896: Harald Hansen
- 1897–1897: Peder Simonsen Holmesland (V)
- 1898–1898: Harald Hansen
- 1899–1899: Peder Simonsen Holmesland (V)
- 1900–1900: Einar Bärnholdt
- 1901–1902: Peder Simonsen Holmesland (V)
- 1903–1903: Harald Hansen
- 1904–1904: Ivar Svenningsen
- 1905–1907: Anders Vesthassel (V)
- 1908–1908: Hans M. Meyer (AvH)
- 1909–1910: Alfred Abrahamsen (LL)
- 1911–1913: Thales Johnsen (H)
- 1914–1914: Anders Vesthassel (V)
- 1915–1916: Tharald Brøvig Sr. (H)
- 1917–1918: Sigvald Nyvold (V)
- 1919–1919: Anders Vesthassel (V)
- 1920–1922: Tharald Brøvig Sr. (H)
- 1923–1925: Thales Johnsen (H)
- 1926–1937: Tharald Brøvig Sr. (H)
- 1938–1940: Karl Briseid (V)
- 1945–1945: Karl Briseid (V)
- 1946–1947: Sverre Carlsen (H)
- 1948–1948: Finn Reinertsen (H)
- 1949–1949: Harald Brøvig (H)
- 1950–1950: Finn Reinertsen (H)
- 1951–1964: Harald Brøvig (H)
- 1965–1973: Sveinung Tveit (V)
- 1974–1975: Martin Sudland (Sp)
- 1976–1979: Richard Urbye Buch (H)
- 1980–1987: Julius Andersen (H)
- 1988–1991: Ole Conrad Evenstad (KrF)
- 1992–2003: Ove Rullestad (H)
- 2003–2007: Margit Brøvig (H)
- 2007–2011: Stein Arve Ytterdahl (Ap)
- 2011–2015: Richard Ivar Buch (H)
- 2015–2023: Arnt Abrahamsen (Ap)
- 2023–present: Ingrid Williamsen (FrP)

== Economy ==
The largest industries are Alcoa Lista, an aluminium plant that employs 270; A maker of auto parts, Aludyne Norway has c. 250 employees.

Farsund Aluminium Casting AS, which makes auto parts out of aluminium. Historically, shipping and fisheries have also been important. Farsund is the largest agricultural district in the county of Vest-Agder, having 26 square kilometres (10 sq mi) productive land, 88 square kilometres (34 sq mi) of forest, and 11 square kilometres (4.2 sq mi) freshwater areas. Farsund was already organized as a trading centre in 1795, and in 1995 celebrated its 200-year jubilee.

Trade and shipping laid the foundation for prosperity, and "the city of the strait" was a period one of the world's largest shipping towns in relation to the size of population.

== Geography ==
Farsund is a coastal municipality in the far southwestern part of Norway, bordering Kvinesdal Municipality in the north and Lyngdal Municipality in the north and east. It sits along the North Sea and the Fedafjorden and Listafjorden lie along the northwestern side of the municipality and the Lyngdalsfjorden lies in the eastern part of the municipality. The municipality includes two large peninsulas jutting out into the ocean: Lista and Spindslandet. The highest point in the municipality is the 487.23-metre (1,598.5 ft) tall mountain Kalåskniben, located on the border with Lyngdal Municipality. The coastal municipality has two lighthouses: Lista Lighthouse in the west and Søndre Katland Lighthouse in the south.

=== Climate ===
Farsund has a temperate oceanic climate (Cfb). The driest season is April - July, and the wettest season is October - January. In January 1942, Lista recorded a low of −22.3 °C (−8.1 °F), and July 2001 recorded a high of 29.3 °C (84.7 °F). The Lista lighthouse weather station has been recording since 1867.

Climate data for Lista Lighthouse in Farsund 1991-2020, extremes 1932-2025 (14 m)
Month	Jan	Feb	Mar	Apr	May	Jun	Jul	Aug	Sep	Oct	Nov	Dec	Year
Record high °C (°F)	10.1 (50.2)	10.9 (51.6)	15.6 (60.1)	23.0 (73.4)	26.5 (79.7)	28.3 (82.9)	29.3 (84.7)	29.1 (84.4)	26.9 (80.4)	18.4 (65.1)	14.4 (57.9)	11.2 (52.2)	29.3 (84.7)
Mean daily maximum °C (°F)	4.5 (40.1)	3.9 (39.0)	5.3 (41.5)	9 (48)	12.6 (54.7)	15.3 (59.5)	17.9 (64.2)	18.5 (65.3)	15.7 (60.3)	11.5 (52.7)	7.8 (46.0)	5.4 (41.7)	10.6 (51.1)
Daily mean °C (°F)	2.7 (36.9)	1.9 (35.4)	3.2 (37.8)	6.2 (43.2)	9.8 (49.6)	12.7 (54.9)	15.4 (59.7)	15.9 (60.6)	13.3 (55.9)	9.4 (48.9)	6 (43)	3.7 (38.7)	8.4 (47.1)
Mean daily minimum °C (°F)	0.6 (33.1)	0 (32)	1.2 (34.2)	3.7 (38.7)	7.2 (45.0)	10.3 (50.5)	12.9 (55.2)	13.3 (55.9)	11 (52)	7.1 (44.8)	3.9 (39.0)	1.3 (34.3)	6.0 (42.9)
Record low °C (°F)	−22.3 (−8.1)	−14.8 (5.4)	−13.7 (7.3)	−6.9 (19.6)	−1.0 (30.2)	2.0 (35.6)	6.1 (43.0)	6.2 (43.2)	2.4 (36.3)	−3.9 (25.0)	−10.0 (14.0)	−16.0 (3.2)	−22.3 (−8.1)
Average precipitation mm (inches)	127.1 (5.00)	89.9 (3.54)	87.7 (3.45)	63.3 (2.49)	61.1 (2.41)	62.9 (2.48)	81.1 (3.19)	106 (4.2)	116 (4.6)	142.7 (5.62)	129.2 (5.09)	128.2 (5.05)	1,195.2 (47.12)
Average precipitation days (≥ 1 mm)	16	15	13	10	10	9	11	12	13	15	16	16	156
Source 1: Norwegian Meteorological Institute
Source 2: NOAA - WMO averages 91-2020 Norway

== Culture ==
Seven large burial mounds that have been restored, are visible; they are part of Lundefeltet ('the Lunde field') on Lista, a peninsula; one of the graves is of a woman and it is dated to c. 500 AD.

The Huseby Stone (Huseby-steinen) is a rune stone, tentatively dated to the 12th century. The Lunde Stone has petroglyphs and is c. 3500 years old.

=== Churches ===
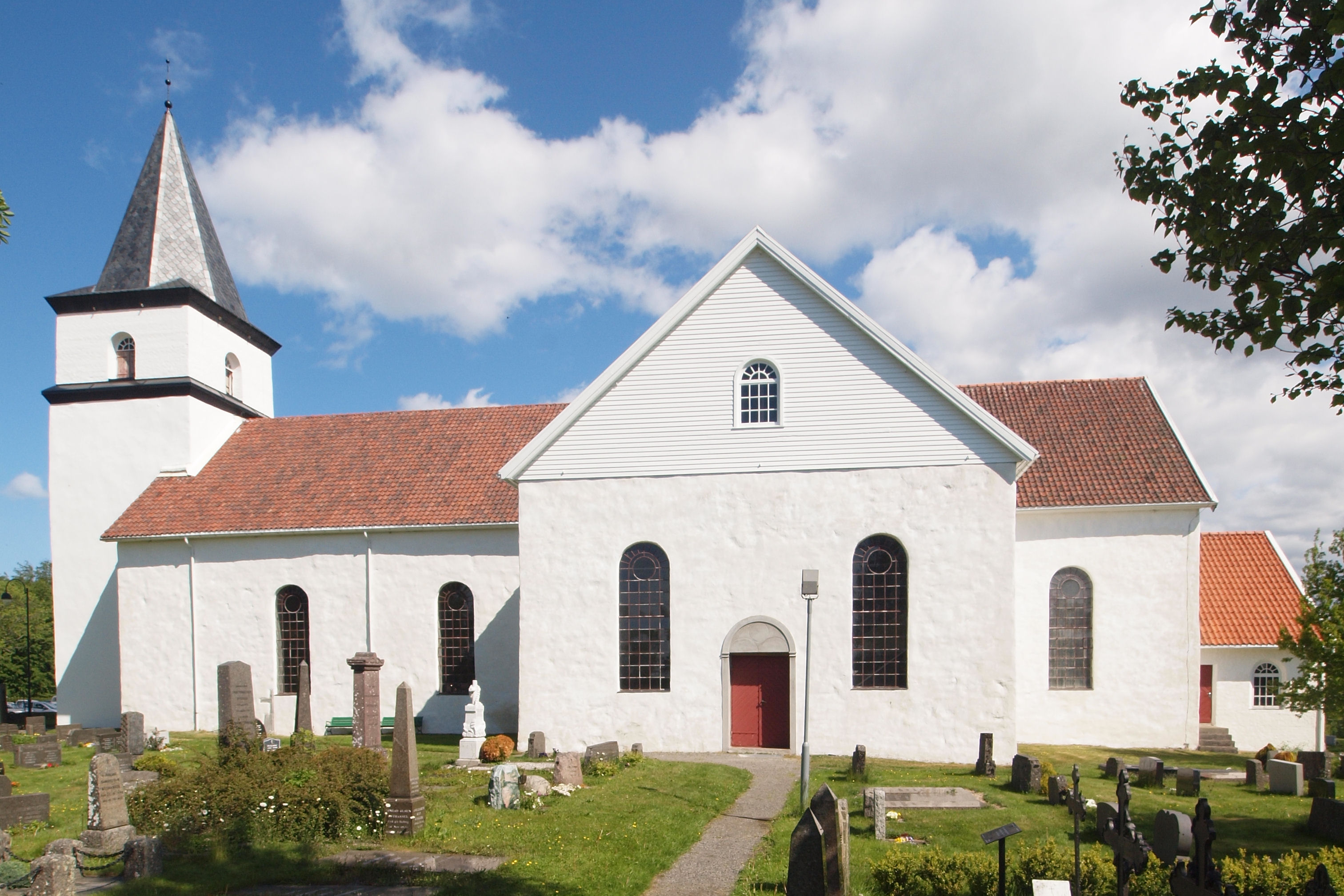
Historic Vanse Church

The Church of Norway has three parishes (sokn) within Farsund Municipality. It is part of the Lister og Mandal prosti deanery in the Diocese of Agder og Telemark.

Churches in Farsund Municipality
Parish (sokn)	Church name	Location of the church	Year built
Farsund	Frelserens Church	Farsund	1905
Farsund	Spind Church	Rødland	1776
Herad	Herad Church	Sande	1957
Lista	Vanse Church	Vanse	c. 1037
Lista	Vestbygda Chapel	Vestbygd	1909

== Farsund Airport ==
Farsund Airport, Lista (FAN) was closed in 2002. The airport had from 1955 to 2002 scheduled traffic to Stavanger, Bergen and Oslo. Airlines which have frequented at Lista are among others Braathens SAFE, Norving and Air Stord.

The Airport was built by Luftwaffe in 1940, and they operated the airport with several fighter squadrons during World War II. After the war, the Royal Norwegian Air Force took over the airport, and for a period it was used as training camp for conscripts.

Today, the airport is privatized and is an industrial area with only minor GA-traffic.

== Education ==
Farsund has 3 primary schools, located in Farsund, Vanse, and Borhaug. Furthermore, there are two junior high schools, in Farsund and Vanse, and two high schools also located in Farsund and Vanse.

== Outdoor activities ==
- Farsund is a town linked to the fjords. Its guest harbour was considered one of the best in Norway, and is full of boats in summer months.
- Every year, Strandmila (5k / 10k run) takes place in Husenby Park. The course covers countryside trails, forest paths and sand beaches.
- The annual Kaperdagene (Pirate Town) festival takes place in July and depicts a battle between British and Norwegian ships who were fighting a war in the 1800s. It has been running since 1996.
- The American Festival (Last weekend in June) is considered one of the most popular festivals in the region. It takes place, as mention in their name, in the last weekend in June in Vanse. And it celebrates the American heritage that many families from Lista brought home with them from the United States in the late 60s and early 70s. It is celebrated with an American inspired parade and also an old Am-Car Parade.

== Twin towns ==
Farsund has sister city agreements with the following places:

- Skagen, Denmark

== Notable people ==
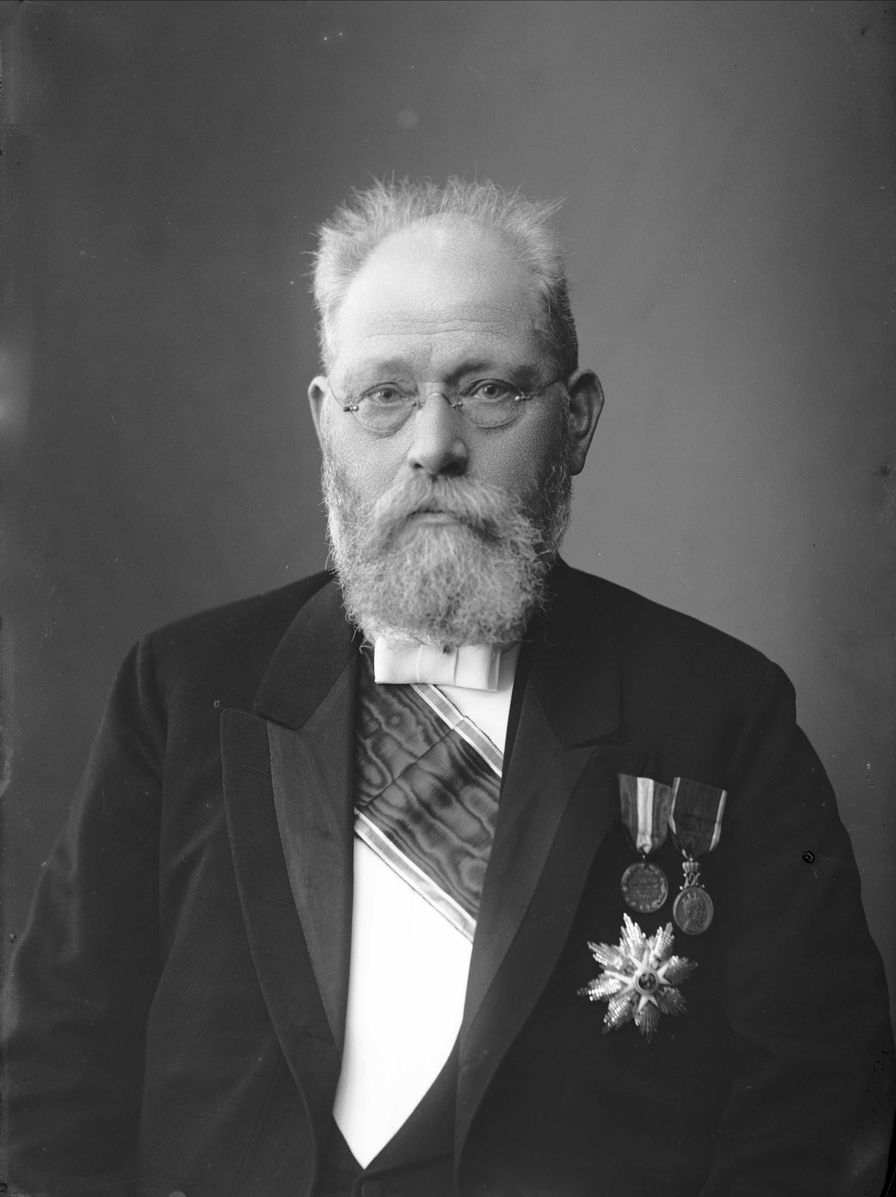
Abraham Theodor Berge, 1912

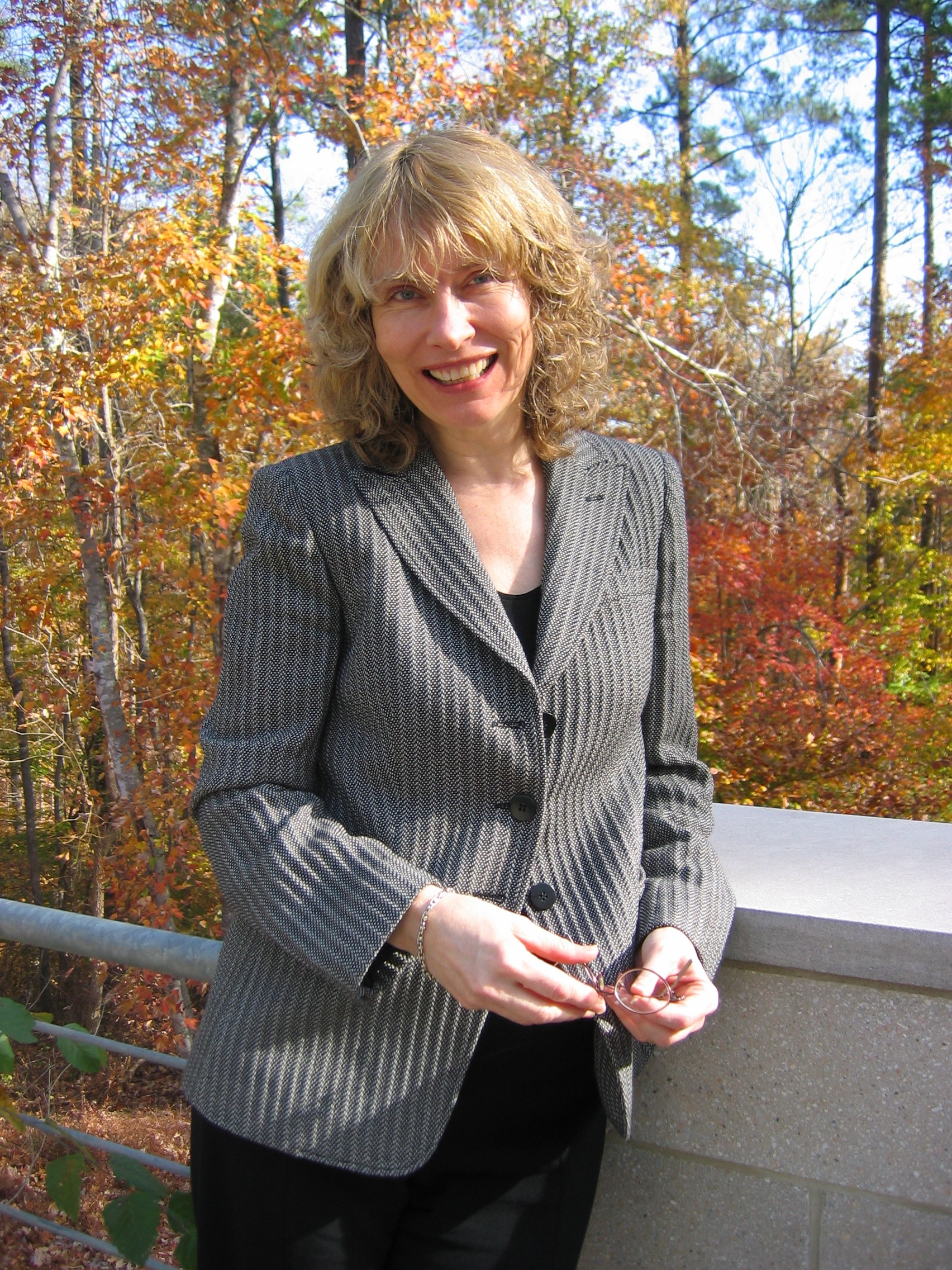
Toril Moi, 2005

- Jochum Brinch Lund (1743–1807), a merchant and shipowner who founded the town of Farsund
- Thomas Fasting (1769–1841), a Norwegian Naval officer and government minister
- Evert Andersen (1772–1809), a Norwegian-Danish sea captain who fought in the Gunboat War
- Gabriel Lund (1773–1832), a merchant and representative at the Norwegian Constituent Assembly
- Eilert Sundt (1817–1875), a theologist and sociologist, who worked on mortality and marriage
- James DeNoon Reymert (1821–1896), an American newspaper editor, mine operator, lawyer, and pioneer settler in Wisconsin Territory
- Lorentz Severin Skougaard (1837-1885), a tenor who moved to the US in 1866
- Abraham Berge (1851–1936), the mayor of Lista Municipality in 1882 and Prime Minister of Norway in 1923-1924
- Halfdan Sundt (1873–1951), a physician who was president of the Norwegian Medical Association
- Vigleik Trygve Sundt (1873–1948), an attorney, genealogist, and politician
- Richard Birkeland (1879–1928), a mathematician who wrote on the theory of algebraic equations.
- Einar Høiland (1907–1974), a meteorologist who studied the theory of lee waves
- Olav Selvaag (1912–2002), an engineer and residential contractor with an innovative approach to designing and building affordable housing
- Odd Starheim DSO (1916–1943), a Norwegian resistance fighter and SOE agent in WWII
- Vesla Vetlesen (born 1930), a weaver, trade unionist, writer, and politician
- Alf Meberg (born 1942), a pediatrician who works on congenital heart defects
- Toril Moi (born 1953), an academic and writer who works on feminist theory and women's writing
- Kjell Elvis (born 1968), a professional Elvis impersonator
- Ingvild Stensland (born 1981), a footballer with 144 caps with Norway women
