= Loshavn =

Village in Farsund Municipality, Norway

Loshavn Loshamn
- Village
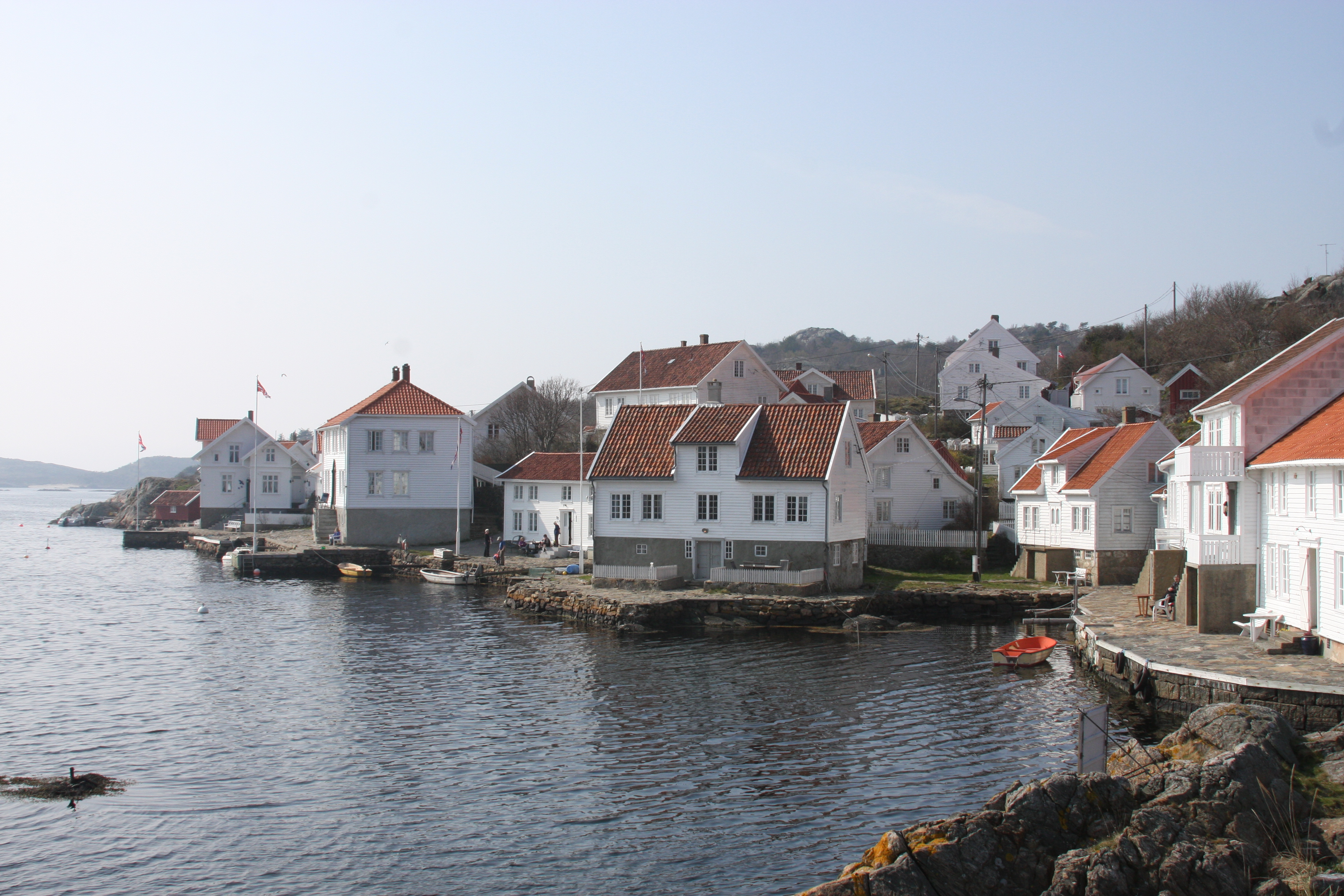
- View of the village harbour
- Interactive map of Loshavn
- Coordinates: 58.06463°N 6.8161°E
- Country: Norway
- Region: Southern Norway
- County: Agder
- District: Lister
- Municipality: Farsund Municipality
- Elevation: 20 m (66 ft)
- Time zone: UTC+01:00 (CET)
  - Summer (DST): UTC+02:00 (CEST)
- Post Code: 4550 Farsund

Loshavn is a small port village in Farsund Municipality in Agder county, Norway. The village is located at the mouth of the Lyngdalsfjorden, about 4 kilometres (2.5 mi) south of the town of Farsund. In 1865, there were over 200 residents, but today there are only a handful, with most of the buildings used as hotels and vacation rentals.

The village has perhaps the best-preserved wooden buildings along the southern coast of Norway. The place has a history of character, especially from the years of the Gunboat War (1807-1814), the so-called "privateer era" (kapertiden). During these years, Loshavn was militarized to protect the mainland from any British invasion and some of the residents also ran unauthorized hijacking of British ships with government approval along the coast.
