= Listafjorden =

Fjord in Agder, Norway

- Interactive map of the fjord
- Location: Agder county, Norway
- Coordinates: 58.1855°N 06.5935°E
- Type: Fjord
- Basin countries: Norway
- Max. length: 10 kilometres (6.2 mi)
- Max. width: 10 kilometres (6.2 mi)

Listafjorden is a widely shaped fjord (or bay) between the island of Hidra and the Lista peninsula in Agder county, Norway. The fjord is located in Farsund Municipality and Flekkefjord Municipality. The 10 kilometres (6.2 mi) long and about the same distance wide at its mouth. The fjord heads inland and right after it passes the island of Andabeløya, it splits in two branches: the Fedafjorden and the Stolsfjorden.

== See also ==
- List of Norwegian fjords
