= Harald Nikolai Brøvig =

Norwegian politician

Harald Nikolai Brøvig (18 July 1917 – 28 February 2010) was a Norwegian politician for the Conservative Party.

He served as a deputy representative to the Parliament of Norway from Vest-Agder during the terms 1958–1961, and 1965–1969.

He lives in Farsund Municipality, and has a fortune of about US$2.1 million.
