= Tarald =

Tarald is a given name. Notable people with the given name include:

- Tarald Brautaset (born 1946), Norwegian diplomat
- Tarald Weisteen (1916–2010), Norwegian military officer
- Knut Tarald Taraldsen (born 1948), Norwegian linguist
