= Knut Tarald Taraldsen =

Norwegian linguist

Knut Tarald Taraldsen (born 23 March 1948, in Oslo) is a Norwegian linguist working in Tromsø as a senior researcher at the Center for Advanced Study in Theoretical Linguistics (CASTL).

His work mostly concerns syntactic theory. He did early, ground-breaking work on parasitic gaps (roughly at the same time as Elisabeth Engdahl), and is also responsible for Taraldsen's generalization concerning the cross-linguistic correlation between null subjects and subject-verb agreement.
