= Olav Selvaag =

Norwegian engineer and residential contractor (1912–2002)

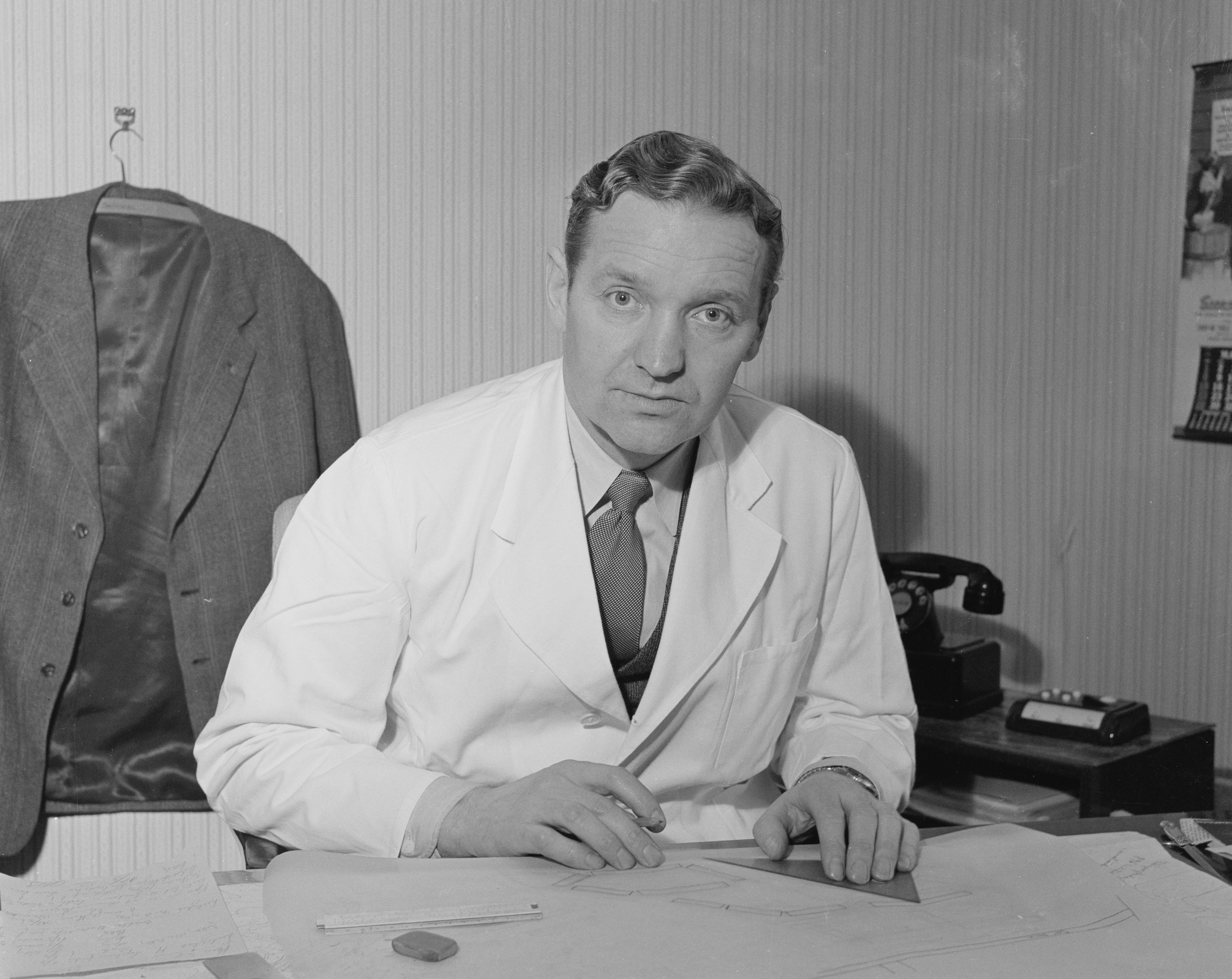
- Olav Selvaag in 1953
- Born: Jens Olav Walaas Selvaag; 17 December 1912; Vanse, Norway
- Died: 14 January 2002 (aged 89); Oslo, Norway
- Education: Norwegian University of Science and Technology
- Occupation: Engineer/contractor
- Years active: 1936–1986
- Known for: Pioneering residential construction in urban areas
- Spouse: Andrea (“Dea”) Marie Brøvig
- Children: Cecilie Nustad, Kari Lene Selvaag, Ole Gunnar Selvaag
- Parent(s): Ole Walaas Selvaag (1870–1930) and Kathrine Amalie Samuelsen (1884–1970)

Olav Selvaag (17 December 1912 – 14 January 2002) was a Norwegian engineer and residential contractor, known for his innovative approach to designing and building affordable housing during the later half of the twentieth century. He was largely responsible for the post–World War II development of the neighborhoods Veitvet and Vestli at Groruddalen and Rykkinn at Bærum in Oslo, Norway.

== Biography ==
Jens Olav Walaas Selvaag grew up in Lista Municipality in Vest-Agder county, Norway. He came from a home with socially-committed parents. His father, Ole Walaas Selvaag (1870–1930), was a medical doctor who rose to prominence as a public health official at the district and county level; and was also a member of parliament for the Liberal Party. Olav's mother was Kathrine Amalie née Samuelsen (1884–1970), a home economics teacher.

As a result of his father's political and professional prominence, the young Selvaag was early acquainted with politicians and statesmen of his time. After having earned his examen artium, he enrolled at the Norwegian University of Science and Technology (then known as the Norwegian Institute of Technology), where he was in the first class that learned structural engineering with reinforced concrete.

Upon his graduation, Selvaag worked briefly as a consulting engineer in Moss. In 1936 he was accepted into an engineering job at a small contracting firm run by Fredrik Ringnes, leaving 14 other applicants behind him. Selvaag brought much-needed structural engineering expertise to the firm, and Ringnes seemed to appreciate this, increasing his salary after only 10 days and delegating more and more of the leadership responsibilities to him. In 1943, Selvaag was made a full partner at the firm, and in 1956 Selvaag bought out Ringnes's interest and renamed the firm with his own name: Selvaag Gruppen.

During the occupation of Norway by Nazi Germany during World War II, Selvaag and Ringnes were among the very few firms of their time to immediately take a principled stand against performing any construction project for the occupying powers. Both were active in the resistance. Ringnes had to go undercover toward the end of the war, and Selvaag managed weapons stores for Milorg.

== Residential construction ==
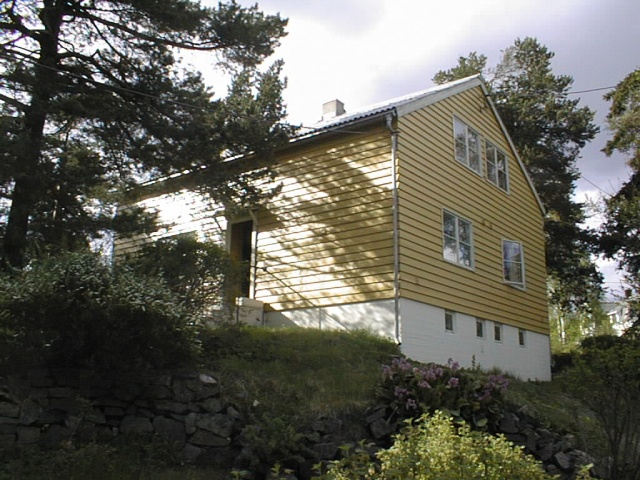
The "Ekeberg House," Selvaag's prototype

Selvaag gained his reputation as an innovator in the austere post-war years, when he wrote an open letter (with drawings) to the Norwegian parliament (with copies to twelve leading newspapers) severely criticizing residential regulations and codes for their inefficiency, and claiming that three times as many residences could be built with the same amount of materials and effort. Challenged to prove his point, he built a test home in the Ekeberg section of Oslo, the so-called Ekeberg House (Ekeberghuset) and first exhibited it on September 3, 1948.

The Ekeberg House was met with skepticism, many thinking it was not durable. Skeptics also thought that the savings in time and material were only possible for a single house, but could not be replicated for larger projects.

Selvaag's approach differed from previous practices in two respects:

- The design and the engineering of the structures were intended first and foremost to be functional. Materials, and particularly insulation, were specified to the needs of the structure, rather than conventional standards, which he considered overengineered.
- In order to ensure streamlined operations, Selvaag insisted on taking general contracting responsibility for a project, with craftsmen as employees or subcontractors.

These practices ran up against prevailing building codes that favored specifications far in excess of expected use, social policy that emphasized public works projects, and the architectural establishment.

The first projects based on this approach were in the residential areas of Bestum and Veitvet in Oslo, but multiple large projects followed: Selvaag took on large projects in Moss and Bærum, building homes on entire tracts. It is estimated that fully one half of all inhabitants of Moss live in homes designed and built by Selvaag. About 35,000 homes in Oslo were built by his company. Selvaag also pioneered the so-called terrace apartments.

His approach and outspokenness made him one of the most controversial figures in post-war Norway. Although non-partisan in his outlook, he commented on a wide range of political issues, including taxation, transportation, and telecommunications. He was asked to serve as minister of industry in the short-lived John Lyng cabinet, but turned the invitation down, citing his wish to remain independent. Brynjulf Bull, the former mayor of Oslo, commented in 1975 that his greatest regret was that the Labour Party had treated Selvaag shabbily.

== Legacy ==
Selvaag's contribution to the housing scarcity in Norway following World War II, and subsequent years, created entire urban neighborhoods, especially in the Greater Oslo Region. His persistent philosophy was that society owed it to itself to use all its available resources to benefit as many of its citizens as possible, and especially those who were disadvantaged. He was an active proponent of building functional and affordable housing, hospitals, and support for the elderly.

Starting with the project in the neighborhood of Veitvet, Selvaag made a custom of buying a sculpture for each of his projects. As a result, he became the largest purchaser of sculpture art in Norway, second only to the Norwegian government. In 1959, he also founded the first music school in Norway in 1959 in Veitvet and ran it until 1972, when he gave the school to the city of Oslo. This school evolved into several other music schools, notable among them the Norwegian Academy of Music.

== Honors ==
- Selvaag received a number of awards and distinctions, including the St. Hallvard Medal in 1986 and the Order of St. Olav (Knight, later Commander).
- Selvaagparken is a park on Bryne just off the center of Vanse in Farsund Municipality.
- Olav Selvaags plass is located as Tjuvholmen in Oslo.
- Selvaagprisen is awarded by the Selvaag Group.
