= Lyngdalsfjorden =

Fjord in Agder, Norway

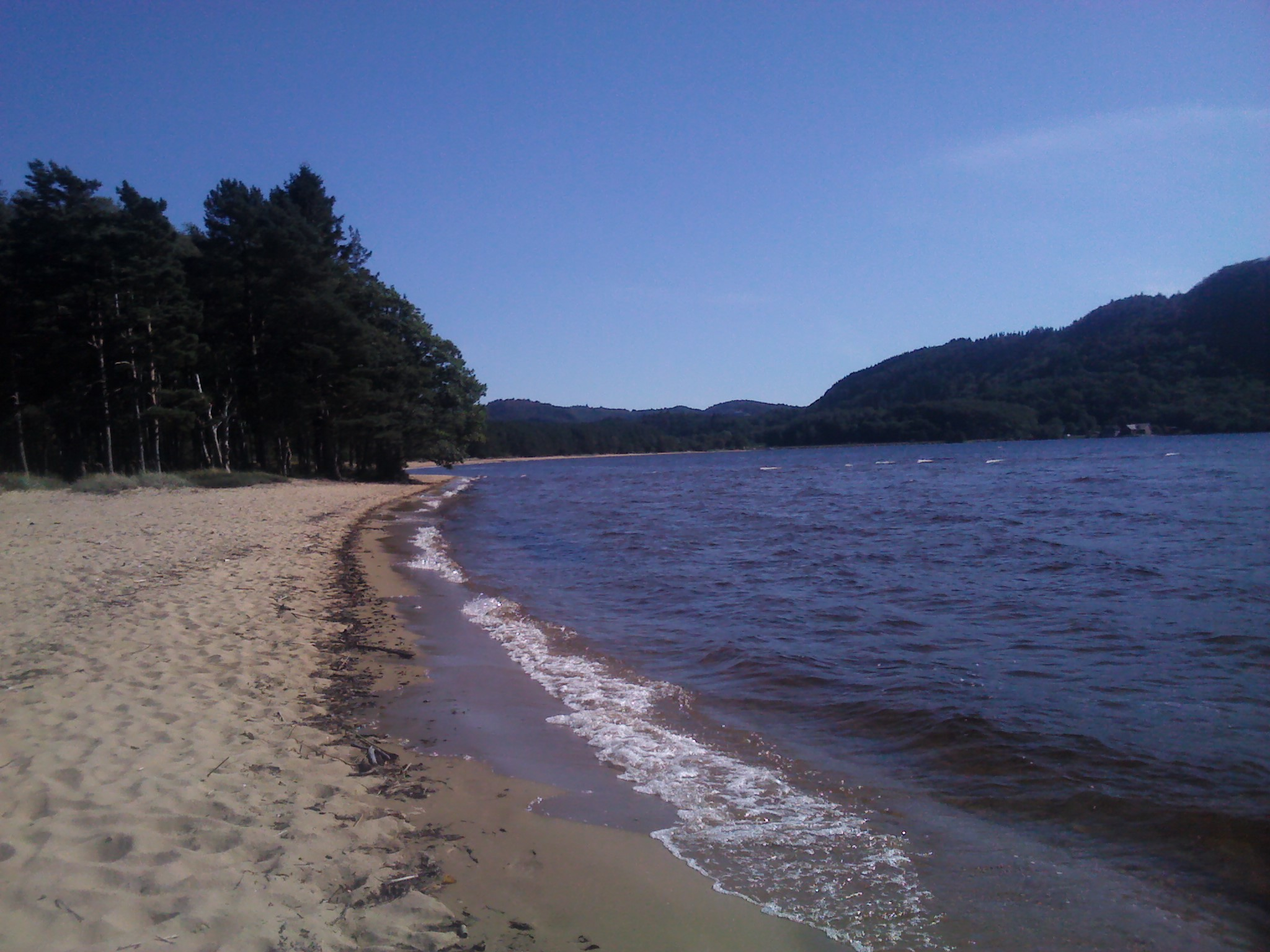
- View of the fjord from the Kvavik beach
- Interactive map of the fjord
- Location: Agder county, Norway
- Coordinates: 58.1243°N 06.8852°E
- Type: Fjord
- Primary inflows: Lygna river
- Primary outflows: North Sea
- Basin countries: Norway
- Max. length: 16 kilometres (9.9 mi)
- Max. width: 1 to 2 km (0.62 to 1.24 mi)
- Settlements: Lyngdal, Farsund

Lyngdalsfjorden is a fjord in Agder county, Norway. The 16-kilometre (9.9 mi) fjord begins at the town of Lyngdal in Lyngdal Municipality and it flows southwest into Farsund Municipality before emptying into the North Sea just south of the town of Farsund. The 1-to-2-kilometre (0.62 to 1.24 mi) wide fjord is fed by the river Lygna and it has a couple larger fjords that join the Lyngdalsfjorden. The Åptafjorden joins the Lyngdalsfjorden from the northwest, coming from Sande and Åpta in the area of the old (historic) Herad Municipality. The large fjord-lake Framvaren flows into the Helvikfjorden, which joins the Lyngdalsfjorden from the west.

== See also ==
- List of Norwegian fjords
