= Lundebanen =

Rail line in Norway

Coordinates: 58.083731°N 6.773573°E

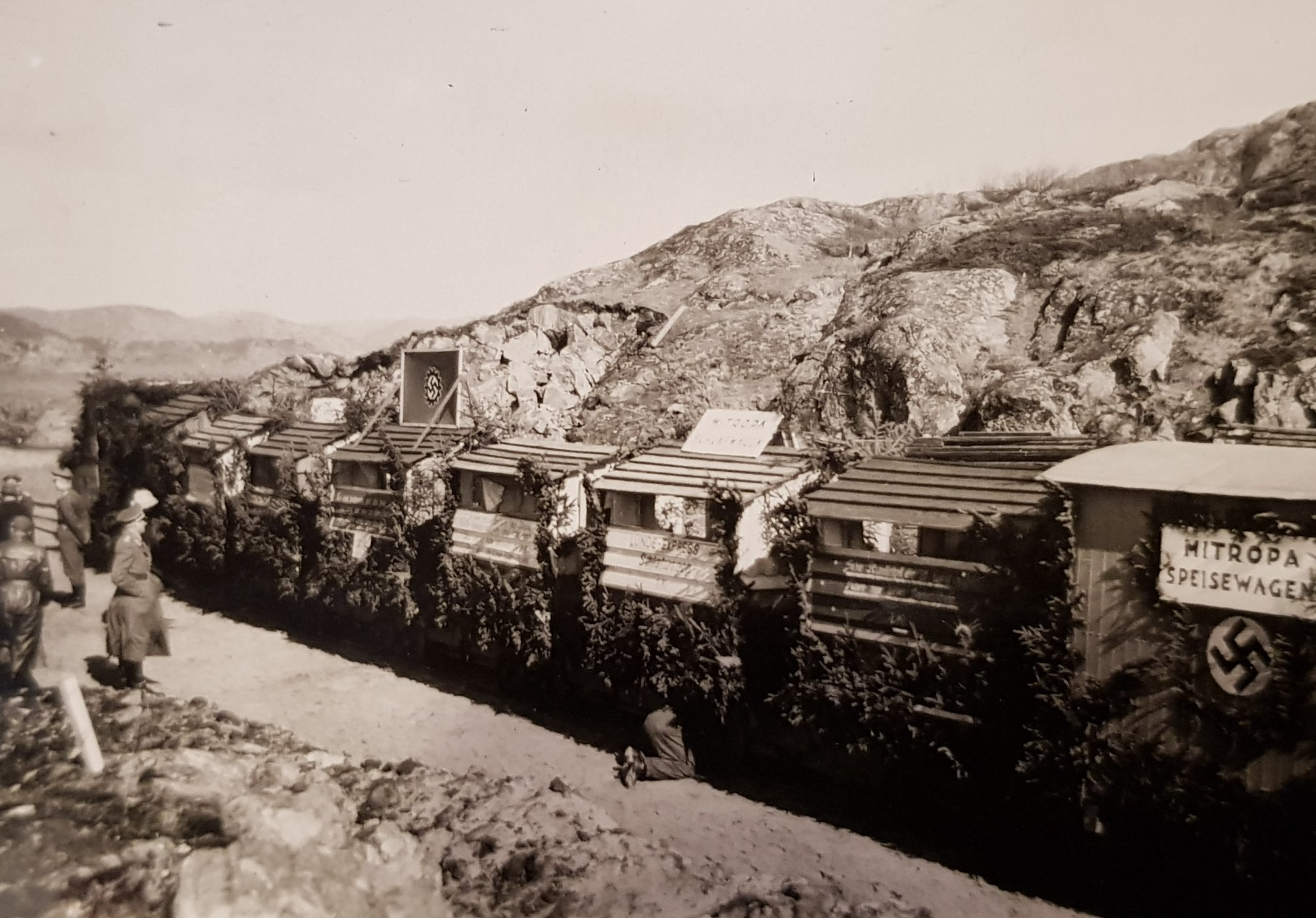
- Opening of the 'Lunde-Bahn' in Farsund, Norway, on 19 April 1943

Technical
- Track gauge: 600 mm (1 ft 11 5/8 in)

The Lundebanen (German: Lunde-Bahn) was a military narrow-gauge railway near Farsund in Norway operated by the German occupying forces during World War II from 19 April 1943.

== Route ==
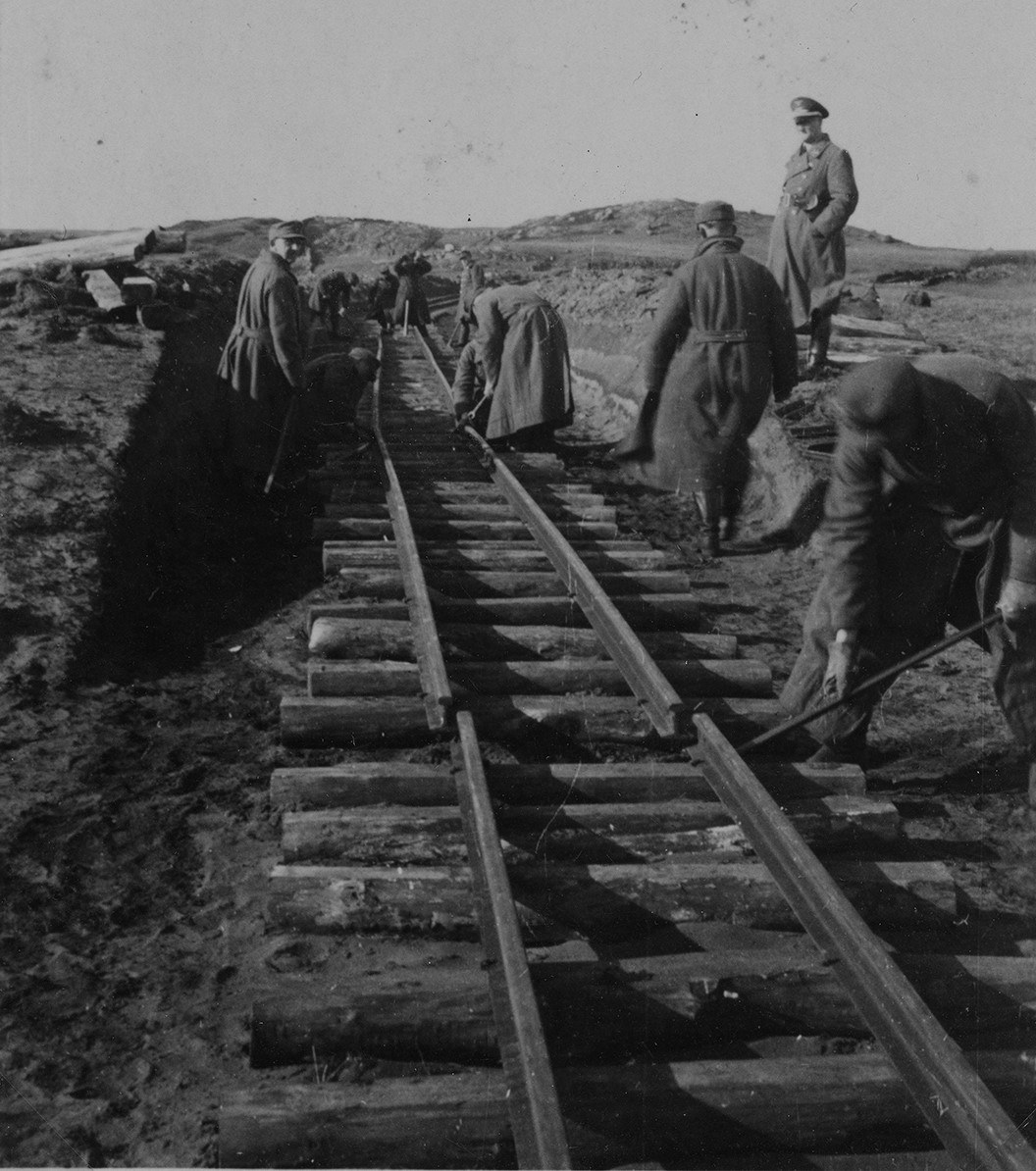
Laying the narrow-gauge track

The route ran from the quay at Lundevågen to the construction site of Lista Air Station, with a branch to a quarry at Mabergåsen, where there was also a workshop. The construction work was led by Captain Buwick.

Due to delivery difficulties, no nails were available to fix the rails to the sleepers. Therefore, 11,000 nails were forged on site.

== Locomotives ==
Two Henschel steam locomotives from Wilh. Wahmann Tiefbau, Bochum, were used for the opening ceremony.

Nr.	Photo	Inscriptions/Captions
65		According to the plan of the Führer we built the LUNDE-Bahn Nach des Führers Plan bauten wir die LUNDE-BAHN
70		Wheels must roll for victory! Räder müssen rollen für den Sieg!
		Left Henschel Danzig (No. 17495/1929) and right Orenstein & Koppel LD2 (No. 5086/1933 or No. 7024/1936)

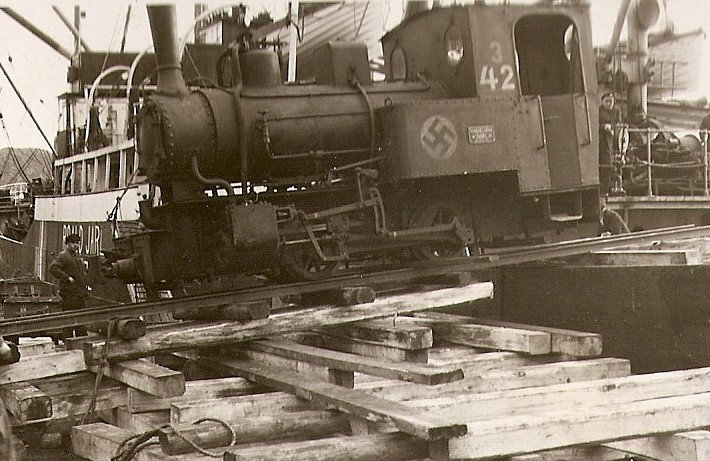
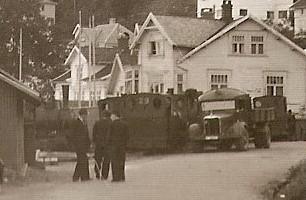
Unloading of the locomotives in the port of Farsund

The locomotives were imported by ship from Germany and unloaded in the port of Farsund. A total of 14 steam and diesel locomotives were used for operation, but not all of them could be operated simultaneously due to lack of fuel.

== Wagons ==
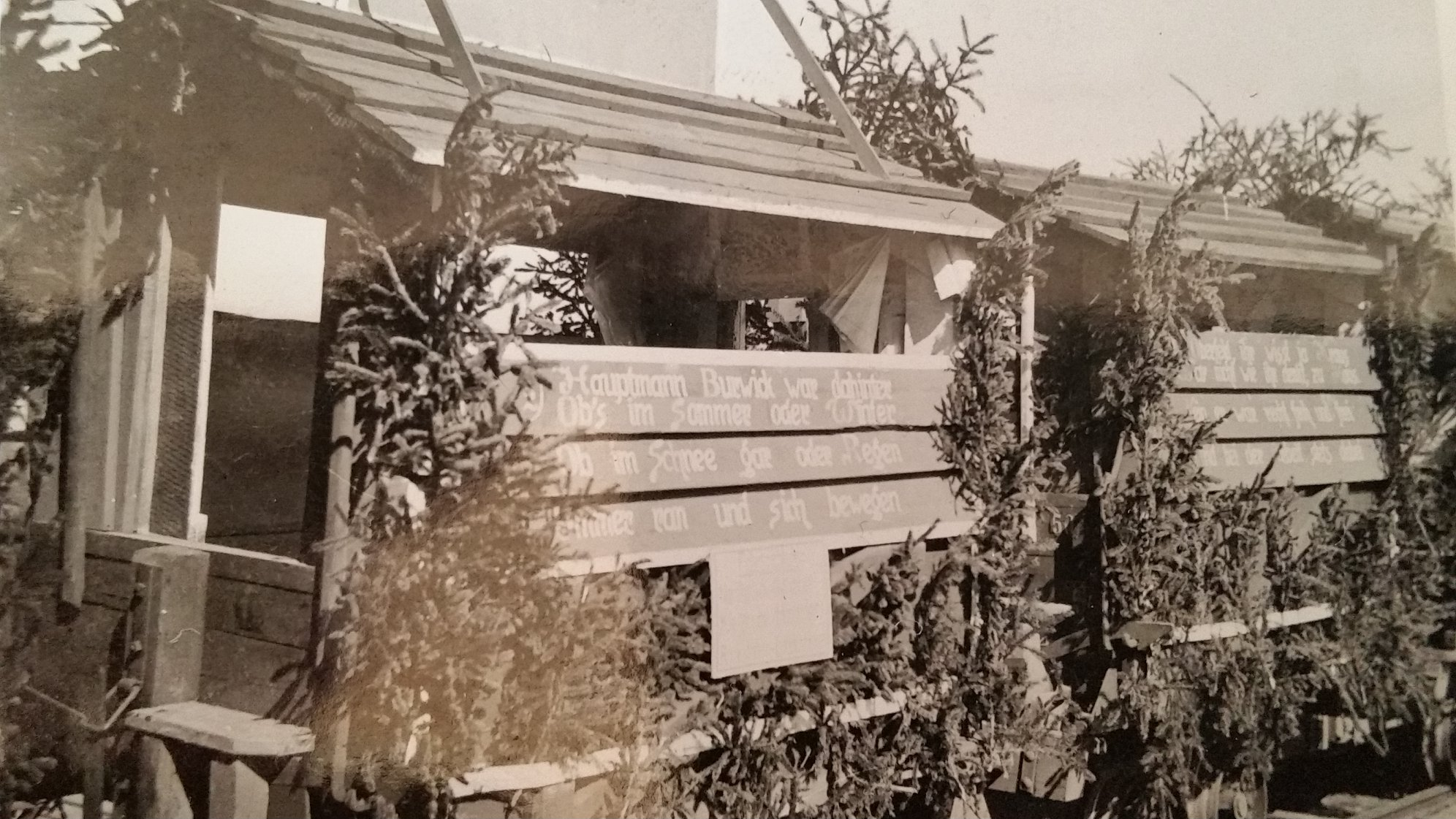
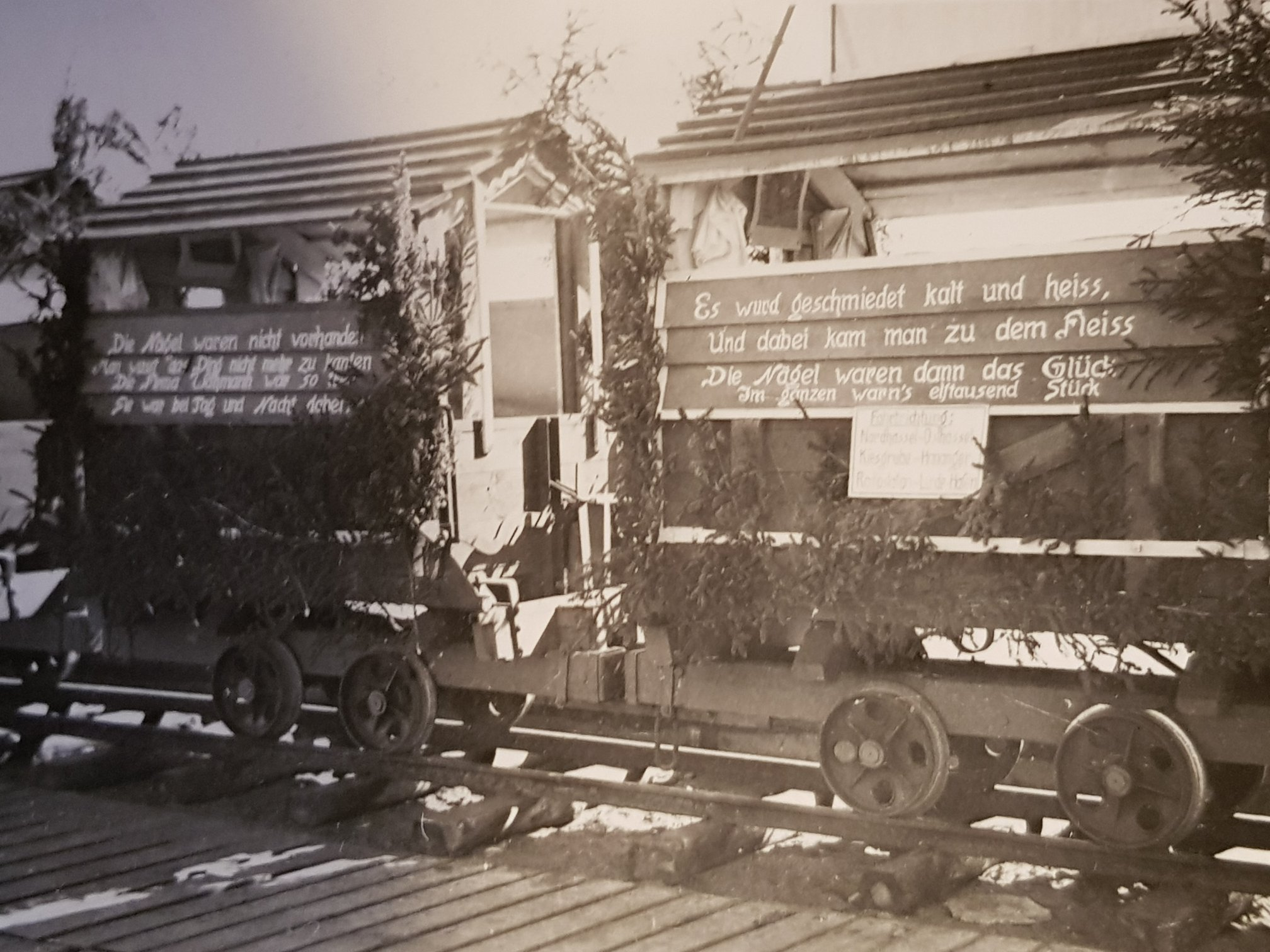
Opening of the 'Lunde-Bahn' on 19 April 1943

At the opening of the railway, a train decorated with fir branches with improvised shelters and a field kitchen for supplying the construction workers, who were inscribed with propaganda poems, was also presented.

== Operation ==
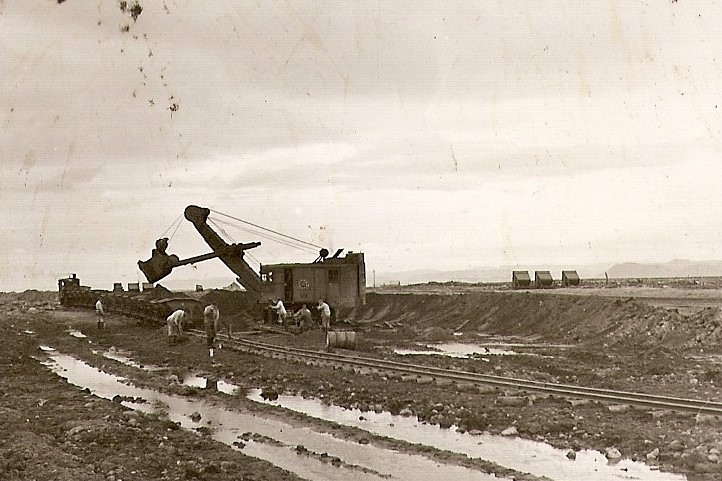
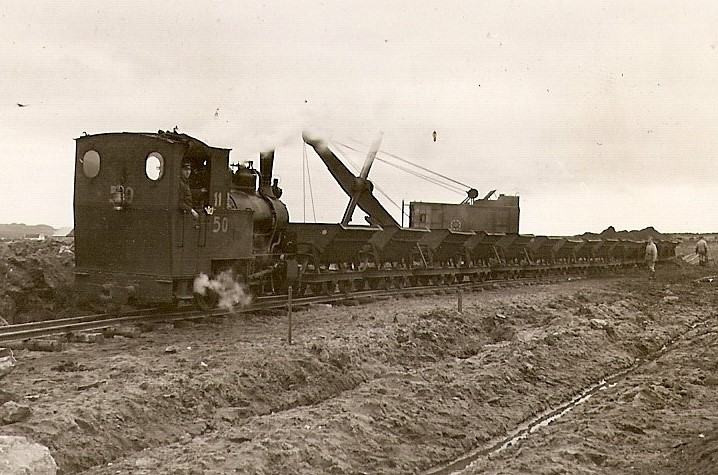
Construction of the Lista Air Station

The main purpose of the railway was earth movement and transport of building materials for the bunkers and Lista Air Station. The German Air Force had already begun construction of the air field in September 1940. It was part of a large military fortification, the so-called Lista Fortress, which was part of the Atlantic Wall. The first construction phase, opened in April 1941, consisted of a 1,700 by 120 metre long wooden runway. The second construction phase was completed in 1944 with a number of service buildings and a 1,571 x 80 metre long concrete runway. Three of the hangars built at the time are still standing today.
