= Mandal Airfield =

- IATA: none; ICAO: none

Summary
- Airport type: Military
- Operator: Luftwaffe
- Serves: Lindesnes, Norway
- Location: Vestnes, Mandal
- Coordinates: 58.0263°N 007.4353°E

Map
- Location in Norway

Runways
| Direction | Length | | Surface |
| Direction | m | ft | Surface |
|---|---|---|---|
| | ~~1,520~~ | ~~4,990~~ | ~~Wood~~ |

Mandal Airfield (Norwegian: Mandal flyplass) was a military air base situated at Vestnes in Lindesnes Municipality, Norway. It featured a wooden runway measuring 1,520 by 80 meters (4,990 by 260 ft). Built by the German Luftwaffe in 1940 after Nazi Germany occupied Norway, it remained in use for the rest of the Second World War. Lista Air Station opened in April 1941, after which Mandal remained only a reserve airfield. A 1950 proposal to rejuvenate it as a civilian airport was turned down by the municipal council.

== History ==
Following the German invasion of Norway on 9 April 1940, the Luftwaffe secured Kristiansand Airport, Kjevik and Sola Air Station, the two land airports along the south coast of Norway. The Luftwaffe quickly assessed that there would be need for an additional airfield located between Kristiansand and Stavanger. Work therefore commenced on building Mandal Airfield, which was completed in August 1940.

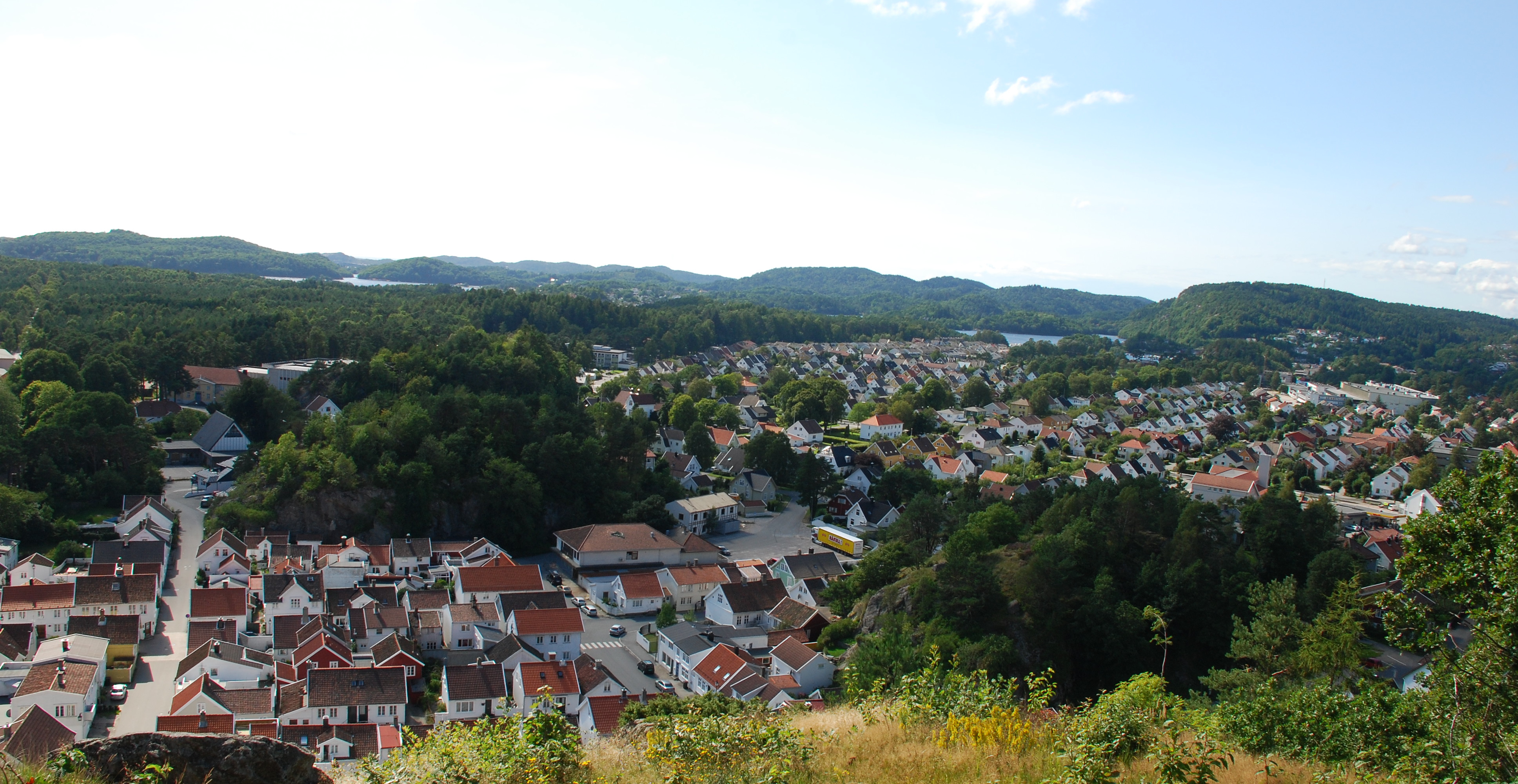
Vestnes is today a residential area

The airfield remained an important site for fighter aircraft which participated in the Norwegian Campaign. However, by Mandal's completion the Luftwaffe had concluded that Lista would be a more suitable site for a major air base. Planning started in August 1940 and Mandal remained in use until April 1941. It was then closed down and operations moved to Lista Air Station. A further expansion of Mandal took place in 1944, with more taxiways and aircraft stands, although these were never used. No squadrons were ever stationed at Mandal and it was closed at the end of the war in 1945.

Civilian interest in the airfield arose in 1950. The struggling Kristiansand-based airline Sørfly proposed that it could use Mandal as a base for charter flights. The issue was discussed by Mandal Municipal Council, but it decided not to allow the reopening of the airfield.

== Facilities ==
Mandal Airfield was situated at Vestnes, located just west of the town center of Mandal. It featured a wooden runway which measured 1,520 by 80 meters (4,990 by 260 ft).
