= FlyNonstop =

Virtual airline of Norway

IATA	ICAO	Call sign
J7	DNM	DENIM
- Founded: 2012; 14 years ago
- Commenced operations: 25 April 2013; 12 years ago
- Ceased operations: 29 October 2013; 12 years ago
- Focus cities: Kristiansand Airport, Kjevik
- Fleet size: 1
- Destinations: 12
- Headquarters: Kristiansand, Norway

Ansic AS, trading as FlyNonstop, was a virtual airline which operated out of Kristiansand Airport, Kjevik, Norway, in 2013. The airline had a 100-passenger Embraer 190 operated by Denim Air. FlyNonstop was owned by Espen Hennig-Olsen, and focused on full service on flights to primary airports serving the tourist market. The company slogan was Norwegian: Fra der du bor. Til dit du skal.

Services commenced on 25 April 2013 to eight international destinations, with two to five weekly departures. FlyNonstop attempted to capitalize on the lack of direct international flights from the Agder region. By June the airline was serving ten international destinations from Kristiansand. It opened a twice-weekly service out of Ålesund Airport, Vigra to Nice from 13 June. Operation ceased on 29 October, a day before flights out of Bodø Airport were to commence.

== History ==
Espen Hennig-Olsen owned a third of the ice cream-manufacturer Hennig-Olsen along with his brothers Paal and Martin. Espen sold his third to the others in 2011 as part of an option they had come to agree on previously and received a payment of 54.7 million Norwegian krone. He also quit as director of marketing in the company.

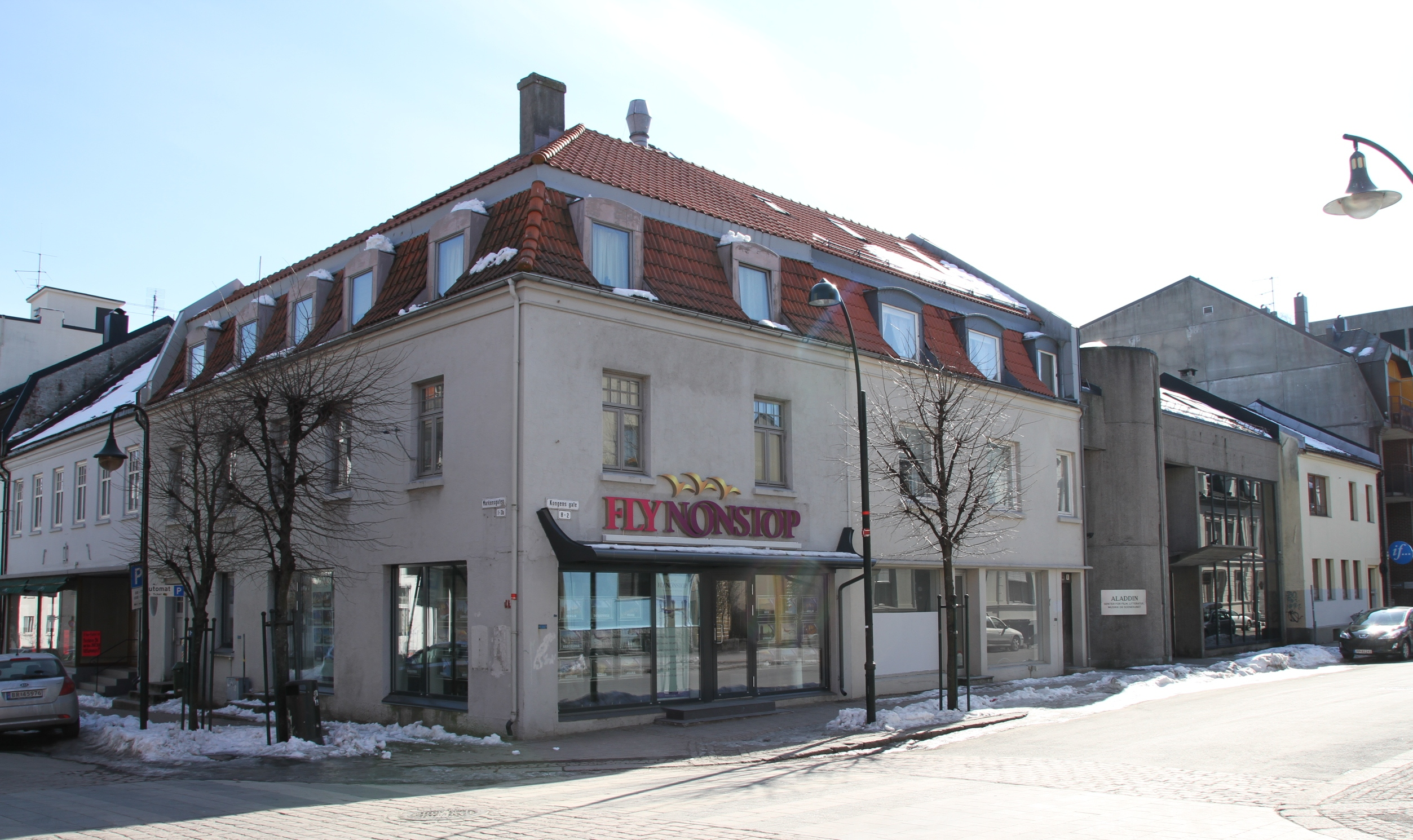
FlyNonstop's headquarters in December 2012

Hennig-Olsen announced the airline on 16 October 2012. He stated that the company needed a passenger load factor of sixty-five percent to break even. Operations commenced on 25 April 2013 with eight destinations. The background for the establishment was the opportunity to serve direct flights out of Kjevik. The airport, which has a catchment area of 300,000 people in Agder, was amongst the busiest in the country with a limited international services. International services were at the time limited to Amsterdam and Copenhagen. Hennig-Olsen hoped to provide a comparable service to that of other airports centered in regional centers. People living in Agder were therefore forced to use Stavanger Airport, Sola; Sandefjord Airport, Torp or Oslo Airport, Gardermoen for most international flights.

The airline received NOK 600,000 in municipal support from Kristiansand's defunct Kjevik Council in January 2013. It was intended to make the route more attractive for foreign tourists to visit Agder. They also received a start-up discount from the airport operator Avinor. This consisted of NOK 150,000 annually in a cash discount for the first three years, a 40-percent discount on passenger fees and no landing fees the first year. FlyNonstop announced on 25 February that they would commence services out of Ålesund Airport, Vigra to Nice.

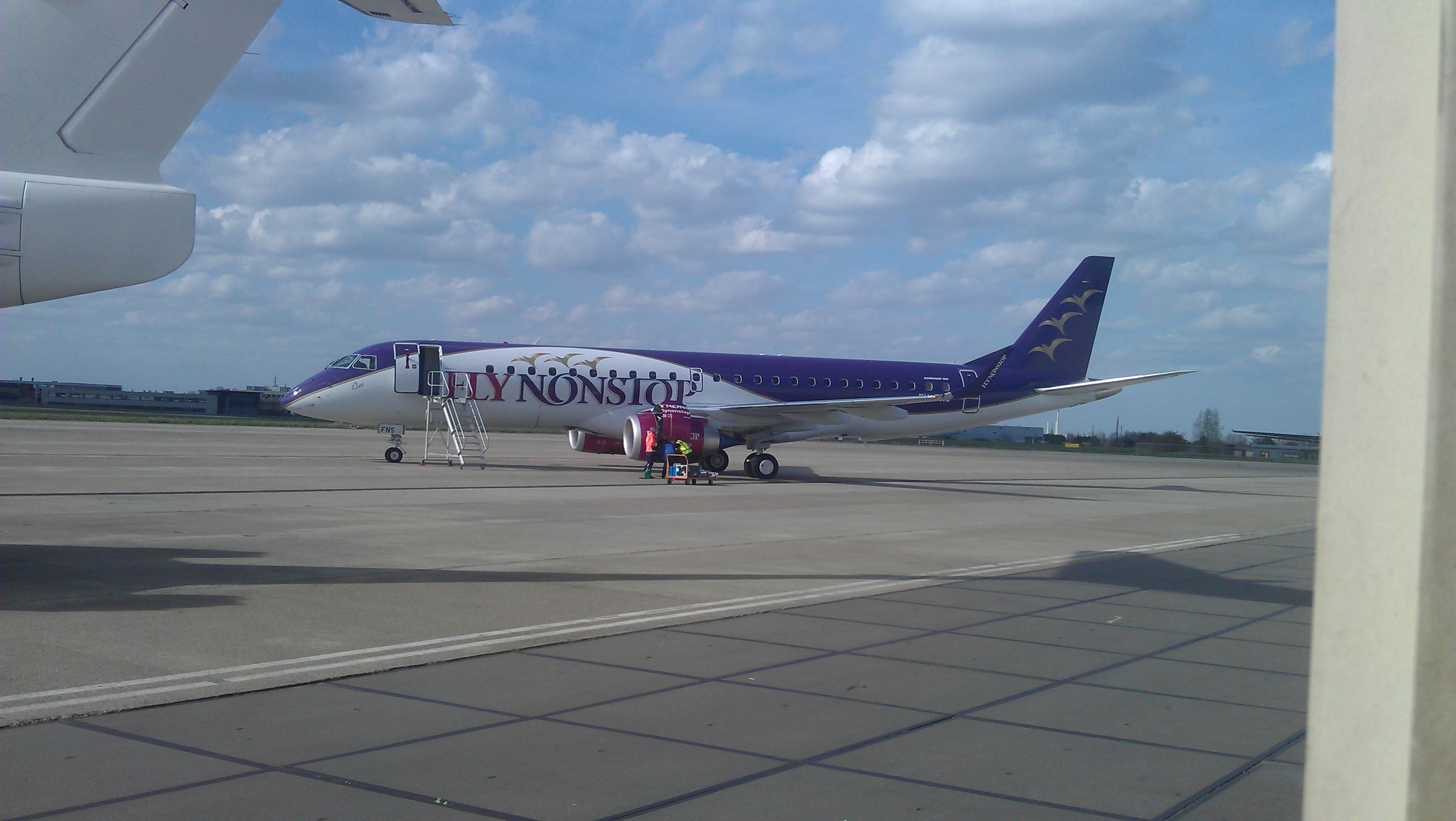
FlyNonstop's Embraer 190 parked at Maastricht Aachen Airport in 2013

The brand new Embraer 190 was delivered on 16 April. By using an aircraft with only 100 seats, FlyNonstop hoped to fill up the aircraft to destinations without sufficient patronage to fill larger aircraft from competitors like Norwegian Air Shuttle and Scandinavian Airlines. Operations commenced on 25 April with five weekly flights to London and two weekly flights each to Barcelona, Berlin, Dubrovnic, Nice, Parma, Paris and Palma de Mallorca.

The airline announced in late April that it planned to build a hangar at Kjevik and that it had made an agreement with Avinor to rent a lot. The structure was estimated to cost between NOK 5 and 10 million. The Ålesund to Nice flights commenced on 13 June. The same week the Kristiansand flights to Berlin and Paris were terminated for the remainder of the summer, resuming in late August. Few people took city holidays during the summer months and instead FlyNonstop allocated flights to Mediterranean holiday destinations.

FlyNonstop announced from June 2013 and onwards a series of new routes which were scheduled to commence in 2014. This included a route from Ålesund to St. Gallen–Altenrhein Airport in Switzerland from January 2014. From Alta Airport the airline planned a route to London, primarily targeting English tourists to Norway. The airline also articulated plans that the route from Alta to Oslo might be suitable as a domestic route. From Bodø Airport the airline also planned a London route starting 1 November 2013. From Kristiansand the airline planned new routes to St. Gallen, Gazipasa, Santorini, Dublin, Stockholm and Manchester.

Up until 30 September the airline had an income of NOK 40 million and costs of NOK 73 million. FlyNonstop ceased all flights on 29 October 2013 and filed for bankruptcy. The airline received a load factor of 69 percent on the London and Dubrovnik routes in July, but had insufficient patronage on other routes. On average the airline needed an extra 13 passengers per flight to break even. The company had a debt of NOK 53 million at the time of bankruptcy, of which NOK 30 million was to Hennig-Olsen's Tamburin Invest. He stated that he had lost about half his fortune on the airline. The largest uncovered debt was NOK 7.8 million to Denim Air.

== Operations ==
FlyNonstop was the trading name for Ansic AS, a limited company entirely owned by Espen Hennig-Olsen. It was a virtual airline, thus not operating any aircraft itself and wet-leasing operations. The company was therefore prohibited for marketing themselves as an "airline" and instead had to refer to themselves as a "travel company". FlyNonstop operated using a 100-passenger Embraer 190 which was leased from CIT Group and flown on its behalf by Dutch charter specialist Denim Air. The aircraft was named Elias.

The aircraft featured a lenient seat pitch with 100 passengers in a single-class configuration. Tickets were sold in two classes, "best price" and "flex price". Prices varied from NOK 1798 to 4998 per round trip. In-flight entertainment was provided with an iPad on each seat. Complimentary in-flight meals were made in Kristiansand by Bølgen & Moi using local food, with the menus based on the cuisine of the destination. By having only 100 seats, the airline only needed two cabin crew on board. This allowed the company to limit the number of such crew to ten.

== Destinations ==
FlyNonstop was based at Kristiansand Airport, Kjevik. It also flew a limited number of flights from Ålesund Airport, Vigra. Flights were carried out to premium airports in each city.

List of destinations
City	Country	Airport
Alicante	Spain	Alicante Airport
Barcelona	Spain	Barcelona-El Prat Airport
Berlin	Germany	Berlin Schönefeld Airport
Dubrovnik	Croatia	Dubrovnik Airport
Kristiansand	Norway	Kristiansand Airport, Kjevik
London	United Kingdom	London City Airport
Nice	France	Nice Côte d'Azur Airport
Palma	Spain	Palma de Mallorca Airport
Paris	France	Charles de Gaulle Airport
Parma	Italy	Parma Airport
Ålesund	Norway	Ålesund Airport, Vigra

== Fleet ==
FlyNonstop's fleet consisted of one plane throughout its operating history:

FlyNonstop fleet
Aircraft	Total	Orders	Passengers	Notes
Embraer 190	1	0	100	Operated by Denim Air, leased from CIT Group
Total	1	0		
