= Kristiansand Airport =

Kristiansand Airport Kristiansand lufthavn

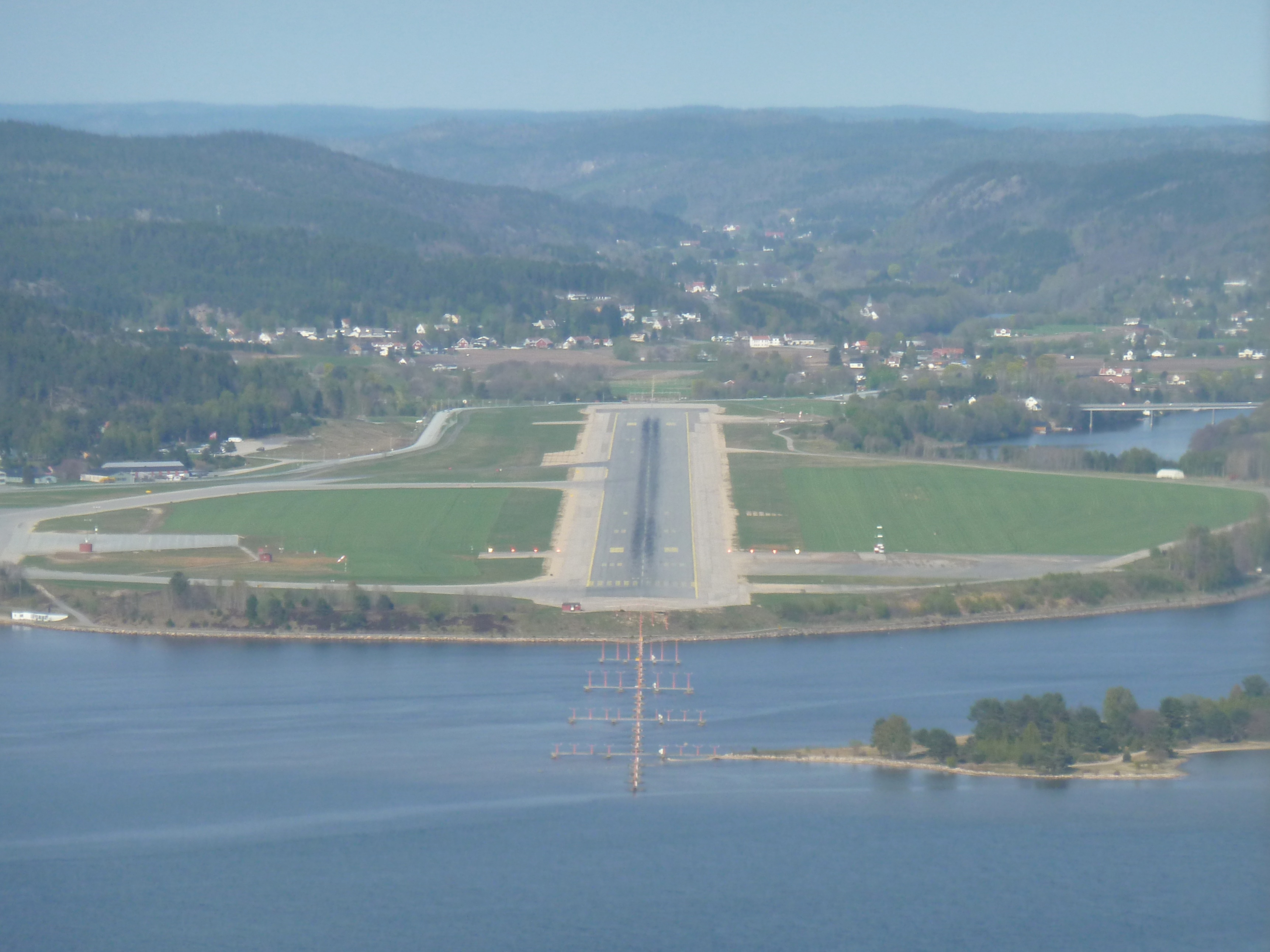
- IATA: KRS; ICAO: ENCN

Summary
- Airport type: Public
- Operator: Avinor
- Serves: Kristiansand, Norway
- Location: Kjevik, Tveit, Kristiansand Municipality, Agder
- Elevation AMSL: 17 m (56 ft)
- Coordinates: 58°12′14″N 008°05′06″E
- Website: Official website

Map
- Location within Norway

Runways
Direction	Length		Surface
Direction	m	ft	Surface
03/21	2,035	6,677	Asphalt

Statistics (2018)
- Passengers: 1,061,130
- Aircraft movements: 19,290

Kristiansand Airport (Norwegian: Kristiansand lufthavn; IATA: KRS, ICAO: ENCN) is an international airport serving Kristiansand Municipality in Agder county, Norway. The airport is located in the district of Tveit in the Oddernes borough, about 16 kilometers (9.9 mi) by road and 8 kilometers (5.0 mi) by air from the center of town of Kristiansand. Operated by the state-owned Avinor, it is the sole airport in Southern Norway with scheduled flights. It has a 2,035-meter (6,677 ft) runway aligned 03/21 and served 1,061,130 passengers in 2018. Scheduled flights are provided by Scandinavian Airlines, Norwegian Air Shuttle, Widerøe, KLM Cityhopper and Wizz Air. The Royal Norwegian Air Force has a training center at the airport.

It opened on 1 June 1939, as the joint second airport in the country. During the Second World War it was occupied and expanded by the Luftwaffe. Kristiansand's southerly location caused the airport to receive several international routes during the early years, as well as domestic services. Braathens SAFE served domestic services from 1955 to its demise in 2004. KLM flew until 1971, after which Dan-Air opened routes to the United Kingdom. The terminal received major extensions in 1955, 1979, 1994 and 2015. New control towers were built in 1966 and 2013. It was the base for Sørfly from 1946 to 1962, for Agderfly from 1969 to 2004, and for FlyNonstop in 2013.

== History ==
=== Construction ===
The first airport in Kristiansand was a water aerodrome situated in the city center. It was built by the Royal Norwegian Navy Air Service in 1918. A government commission recommended on 21 October 1920 that Kristiansand receive a water airport as part of a nationwide investment program. However, nothing came of the plans for more than a decade. Moving of the military water aerodrome was proposed several times, although this was never carried out before the construction of Kjevik.

Locally, the initiative for an airport in Kristiansand was launched by Mayor Andreas Kjær in 1933. The city council sent a formal application to the government in August 1934, asking for an airport. That summer Widerøe commenced flights to Kristiansand along a coastal route from Oslo to Haugesund. Norwegian Air Lines (DNL) commenced a coastal seaplane route along the southern coast from Oslo to Bergen via Kristiansand on 9 June 1935. This service used an aerodrome at Kongsgårdbukta.

The government stated in 1935 that it planned on building a main airport for Agder – Kristiansand, Mandal and Arendal were all proposed as suitable hosts. The government concluded that Kristiansand was the most suitable, based on traffic, military and financial considerations. Several locations were considered. Kongsgårdbakken was selected, costing 2 million Norwegian krone (NOK) less than Kjevik. The municipality and the state formalized construction in April 1936, where the former would provide the land and the construction costs of NOK 2.4 million would be split. Construction commenced soon afterwards.

Meanwhile, a group started looking at Kjevik as a suitable site, led by aviator Bernt Balchen, industrialist Rolf Petersen and Lawyer Hartmann. They presented detailed plans and agreed prices for purchase of lands. Based on this Kristiansand Municipal Council accepted on 5 August 1936 to reconsider Kjevik. Kjevik was passed in the council on 30 September 1937 with 34 against 26 votes. Construction commenced in November and was contracted to Høyer-Ellefsen. The same year the Norwegian Army Air Service used the fields at Kjevik for training.

The airport originally consisted of a 1,000-by-40-meter (3,280 by 130 ft) concrete runway connected to the apron with a 12-meter (39 ft) wide taxiway. A small, wooden terminal building was built of a shed and a nearby residential house was used as a restaurant. Seaplanes were served with a floating dock and a slipway. Kjevik opened on 1 June 1939, the same day as Oslo Airport, Fornebu. The first aircraft to land was a Douglas DC-2 of KLM. They started an international route from Oslo via Kristiansand to Amsterdam, while Danish Air Lines operated to Copenhagen. DNL opened a domestic seaplane route from Oslo via Kristiansand to Stavanger Airport, Sola.

=== Second World War ===
Kjevik was captured by the Luftwaffe during the German invasion on the 9th of April, 1940. The first aircraft landed at Kjevik as an emergency landing on the first day of the invasion. Later it was used by Junkers Ju 52 transport aircraft, flying troops in. From the 11th of April, a squadron of Messerschmitt Bf 109s was stationed at Kjevik.

Luftwaffe immediately started upgrading the aerodrome. They began by removing a hill at the east end of the runway, followed by an extension of the runway. Tveit was transformed with military structures built throughout the village. In the east a minefield was laid and several fuel tanks were built around the airfield. Two large hangars were built, along with a large number of sheds. In the course of the war the runway was extended to 1,580 meters (5,180 ft). The German military planned a large expansion of the airport from 1945, which would have included new aprons and would have obliterated the village. These plans were halted by the end of the war.

=== Early operation ===
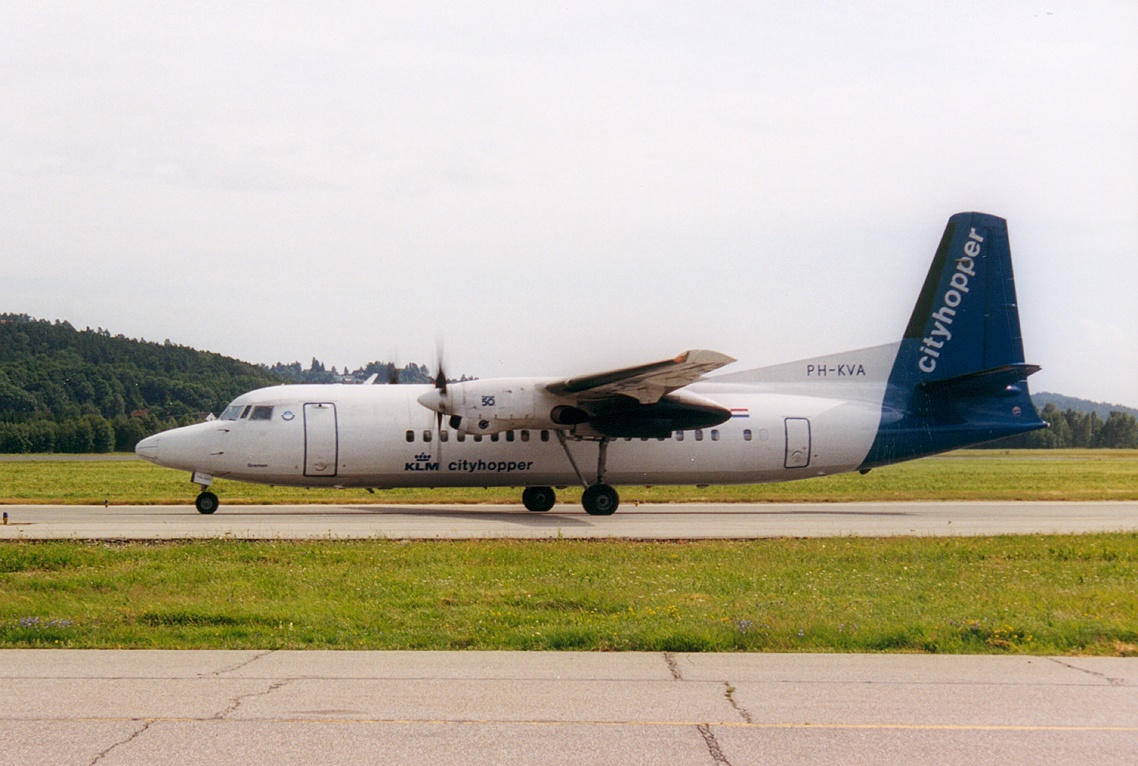
Fokker 50 of KLM Cityhopper at Kjevik in 2000

Kjevik was taken over by the Royal Air Force in May 1945. They started the work of mine sweeping and disarming the armaments and general clean-up of the aerodrome. It was later transferred to civilian use. The Air Force's Aircraft-Technical School and the Weapon-Technical School moved to Kjevik in February 1946. The latter moved to Lista Air Station two years later.

The upgraded facilities resulted in Kristiansand Municipality wanting to rid itself of the responsibility and cost of running the airport. The city council passed a resolution of 9 December 1946 offering the airport free of charge to the state. This was approved by Parliament on 20 June 1947. The same year the aviation club Kjevik Flyklubb was established.

On 6 March 1946 KLM resumed its route, flying from Oslo via Kristiansand to Amsterdam using a Douglas DC-3. By 1950 it was flown three times a week, and continued onwards to Brussels. DNL, through the Scandinavian Airlines System (SAS) cooperation started an international route on 2 October 1946 from Oslo via Kristiansand, Amsterdam and Brussels to Paris. Four days later a domestic Ju 52 seaplane route started from Kristiansand to Stavanger, Haugesund and Bergen. Danish Air Lines introduced a route from Kjevik to Aalborg and Copenhagen in 1947.

DNL started a land plane route from Kristiansand to Stavanger in 1947, but withdrew two years later, using a Douglas DC-3. From 1949 KLM took over flights from Oslo to Kristiansand. Braathens SAFE was awarded the route in 1950, along with an extension to Copenhagen, but abandoned it the following year. The terminal building was expanded in 1953, receiving a new waiting room and a new cafeteria.

Sørfly—the first airline based in Agder—was established in 1946. It operated out of Kjevik, originally with the Auster Autocrats. They performed various general aviation tasks, including sight-seeing, charter flights for hunters, especially to Setesdal and aerial photography. A Republic Seabee and a Miles Gemini were delivered in 1947 and 1948. The airline launched a scheduled route from Stavanger and Kristiansand via Ålborg to Gothenburg. The airline's hangar at Kjevik collapsed in 1954 and the Seabee sold in 1956. From then the airline had less and less activity and liquidated in 1962.

Braathens resumed traffic on 6 June 1955 when it opened a route from Oslo via Tønsberg, Kristiansand and Farsund to Stavanger, with a daily round trip on a de Havilland Heron. These were replaced with the larger Fokker F27 Friendship in 1959. The route served 2,593 passengers the first year, increasing to 17,900 in 1960. Braathens opened a route from Kristiansand to Ålborg in 1960, although this was taken over by SAS the following year. That year the airport had 54,306 passengers.

KLM introduced the Vickers Viscount on the Kjevik route in 1957 and three years later started using the Lockheed L-188 Electra. The Weapon Technical School moved back to Kjevik in 1963. During the late 1950s and 1960s SAS switched its Kristiansand services first to the Saab Scandia and then the Convair CV-440 Metropolitan. Dan-Air introduced summer services to Newcastle-upon-Tyne from 1963, expanded to an all-year service from 1972.

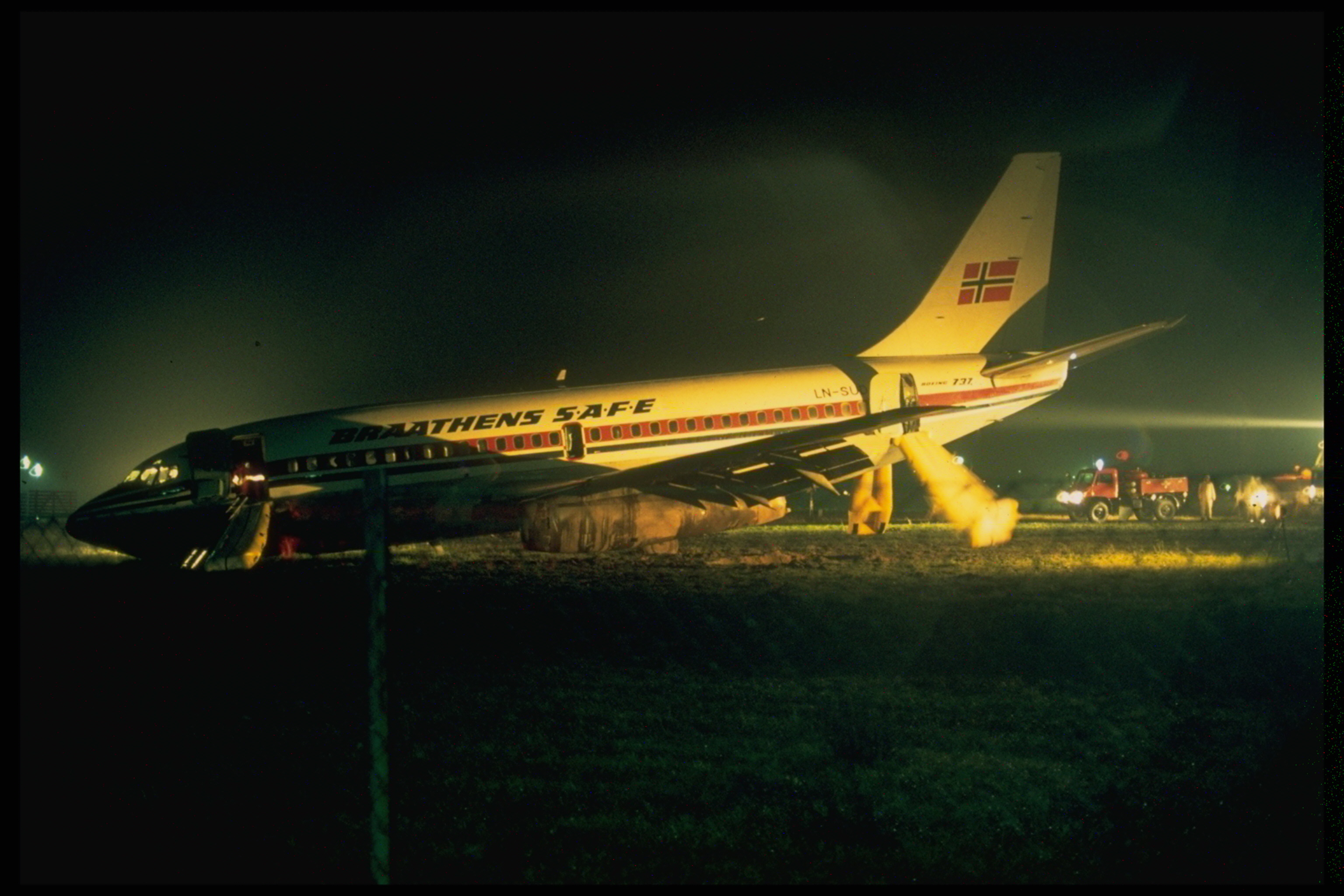
A Braathens SAFE Boeing 737-200 that met an accident at Kristiansand in 1977

New aircraft resulted in the need for a longer runway. The city and the state made an agreement whereby the former would pay for the land while the latter would pay for the construction. The runway was extended to 1,960 meters (6,430 ft) in 1966. On 2 November a new, 18-meter (59 ft) tall control tower opened. The airport had 143,585 passengers in 1965.

Agderfly was established at Kjevik in 1969. The company operated a wide range of aircraft, focusing until the 1980s exclusively as a flying school. KLM introduced the Douglas DC-9 on the Amsterdam route from 1966. However, the stopped serving Kristiansand from November 1971, when the stop was moved to Gothenburg. Braathens introduced the Fokker F28 Fellowship from 1969 and the Boeing 737-200 from 1975.

The airport served 203,875 passengers in 1970, which increased to 295,578 five years later. A parachute club, Kjevik Fallskjermklubb, was founded in 1974. Dan-Air introduced a service to London in 1976. The Air Force's Communication- and Radar School moved to Kjevik in 1977. SAS used the DC-9 for its international route for a period during the 1970s, but as these proved too large later switched to the smaller F27.

=== New terminal ===
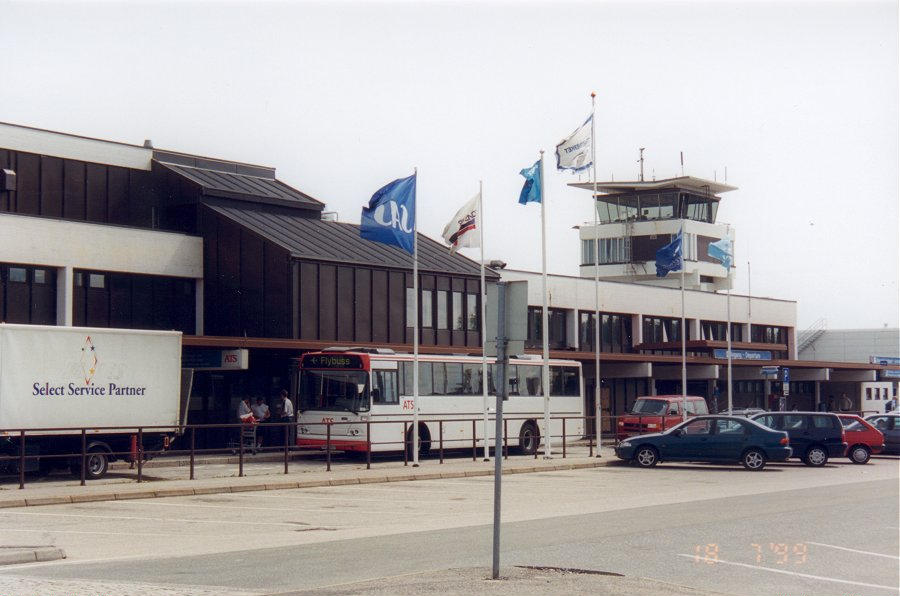
The terminal land side in 1999 showing the 1979 terminal (left), the 1953 terminal and the 1966 tower

Kristiansand was one of six test airports which received a British doppler microwave landing system in 1977. In the late 1970s the terminal was too small, resulting in the airport opening a new 3,500-square-meter (38,000 sq ft) terminal on 22 March 1979, costing NOK 19 million. The terminal from the war had been used for domestic services and was converted to cargo terminal. The international terminal was converted to a terminal for the Air Force. Kjevik served 400,549 passengers in 1980, increasing to 477,549 five years later.

Kristiansand-based Agderfly introduced services to Göteborg Landvetter Airport on 26 September 1989, followed by a Billund Airport route on 2 October. Two years later they received permission to fly to Bremen Airport, but ultimately shut down on 21 November 1991. The flight school continued to operate. SAS was reorganized in 1990 and the Copenhagen routes were taken over by SAS Commuter's Eurolink service with new Fokker 50 aircraft. Norsk Air introduced a service from Sandefjord Airport, Torp via Kristiansand to London Stansted Airport on 28 October 1991. The route had insufficient traffic and was terminated the following year. The airport served 578,373 passengers in 1990, which increased to 745,061 passengers five years later.

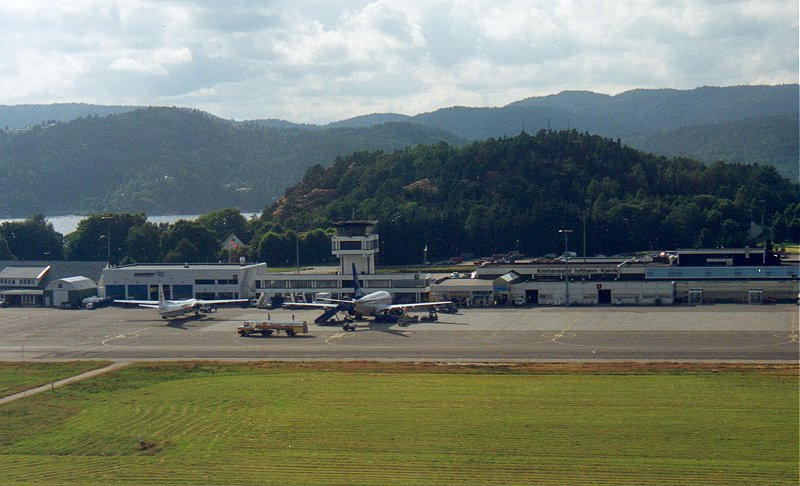
A Norwegian Air Shuttle Fokker 50 and a Scandinavian Airlines Boeing 737 at Kjevik in 1999

Busy Bee went bankrupt in 1992 and their routes to Stavanger and Bergen were taken over by Norwegian Air Shuttle. Following SAS terminating the Copenhagen service on 26 March 1994, Maersk Air introduced three daily flights to Copenhagen. That year the terminal was rebuilt and expanded with another 1,000 square meters (11,000 sq ft). Most of this was expansion of the public areas, including a new baggage area. SAS commenced domestic services from Kjevik on 8 October 1998 when Oslo Airport, Gardermoen opened. This waived the need for landing slots which had limited capacity at Fornebu, allowing for free competition on the route. KLM returned to Kristiansand on 28 March 1999, introducing flights to Amsterdam using a Fokker 50 three times per day. By 2000 Maersk Air had replaced its F50s with jet aircraft on the Copenhagen route. The airport's patronage peaked at 902,295 in 1999, after which the ridership fell and did not recoup until 2011.

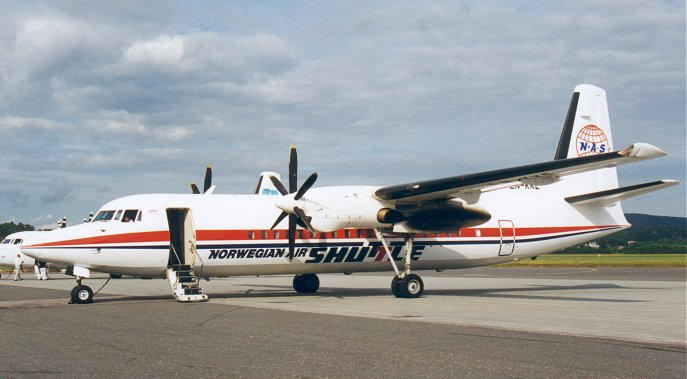
Norwegian Air Shuttle Fokker 50 in 1999

Following the SAS Group purchase of Braathens in 2002, SAS closed its Kristiansand to Oslo route on 2 April. Also as a result of the merger, SAS Commuter took over Norwegian's routes to Stavanger and Bergen on 1 April 2003. The same year SAS resumed its route to Copenhagen, matching Maersk Air with three daily flights. The following year Maersk Air introduced flights to Billund Airport in Denmark. The airline ceased operations the following year. Braathens merged into SAS Braathens in 2004, and resumed as Scandinavian Airlines from 2007. Norwegian returned to Kjevik in 2007 as a low-cost carrier with three weekly flights to London Stansted Airport. However, the route proved to have too little patronage and was closed within the year. However, they introduced three daily flights to Oslo from 5 June 2008, adding to the four daily flights flown by SAS. Widerøe took over SAS Commuters flights to Bergen and Stavanger in 2010.

Avinor installed a 90 meters (300 ft) long section of engineered materials arrestor system at the end of each runway in 2012. Kjevik is the only airport in Norway with this system, as the proximity to vulnerable marine environment prohibits the creation of a conventional safety zone around the runways. The south end was installed in July and the north end later in the year. The installations cost between 70 and 80 million Norwegian krone. The control tower from 1966 was not sufficiently high to give the air traffic controllers full view of the runway. A new 38-meter (125 ft) tall control tower was therefore opened on 3 June 2013.

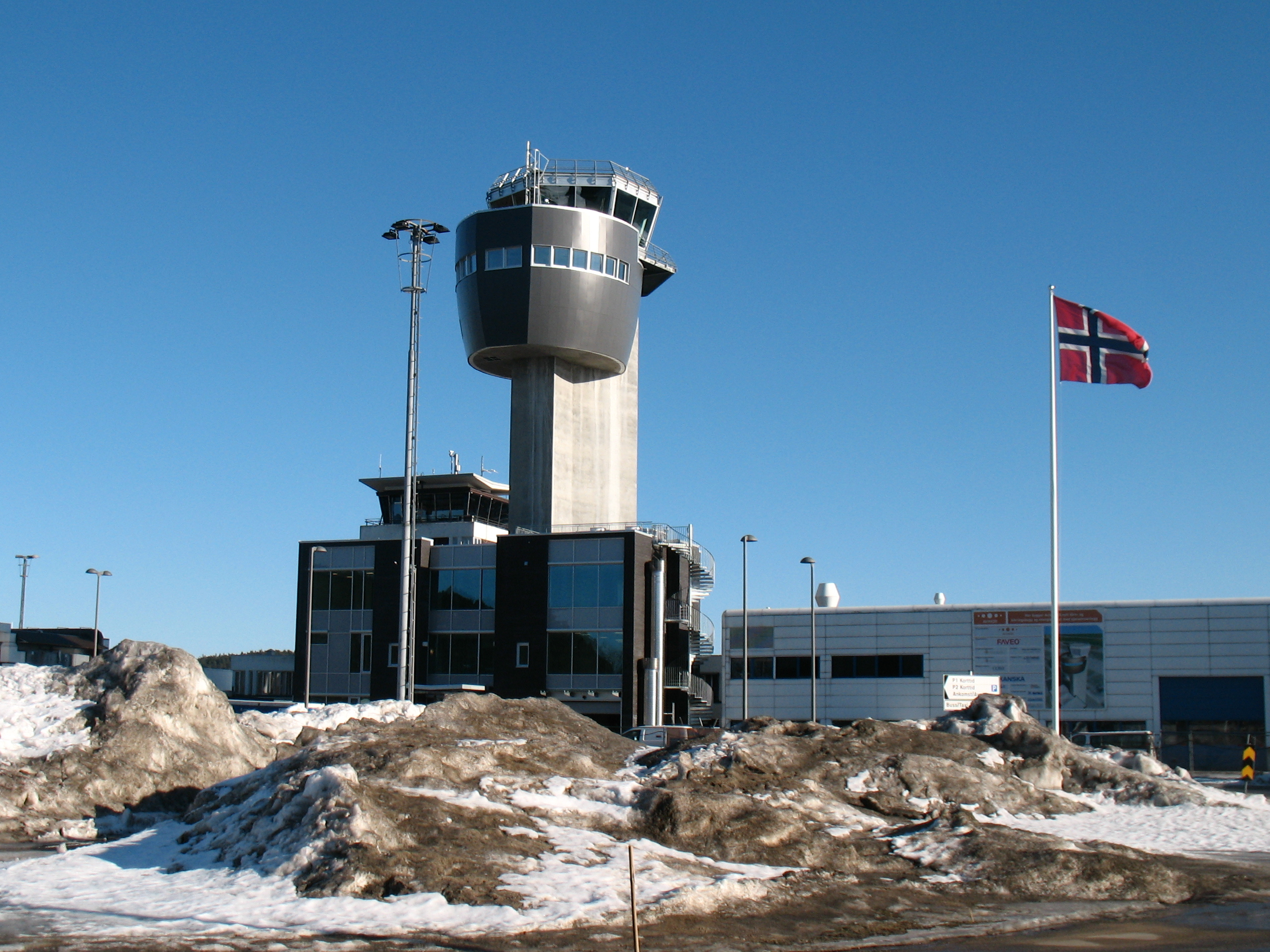
The new tower which opened in 2013

FlyNonstop was established as a Kjevik-based airline and commenced flights on 25 April 2013. They flew to ten sun and city holiday destinations using an Embraer 190 operated by Denim Air. With insufficient passenger load factor, they went bankrupt on 29 October. Wizz Air started a route to Gdańsk using an Airbus A320 in May 2013, mostly targeting the Polish expatriate community.

Construction of a new international terminal commenced in 2014, scheduled for opening in June 2015. It will consist of a 3,200-square-meter (34,000 sq ft) extension of the terminal northwards. It will feature four new gates, of which two can be used for flights out of the Schengen Area. The baggage hall and duty-free shop will be expanded.

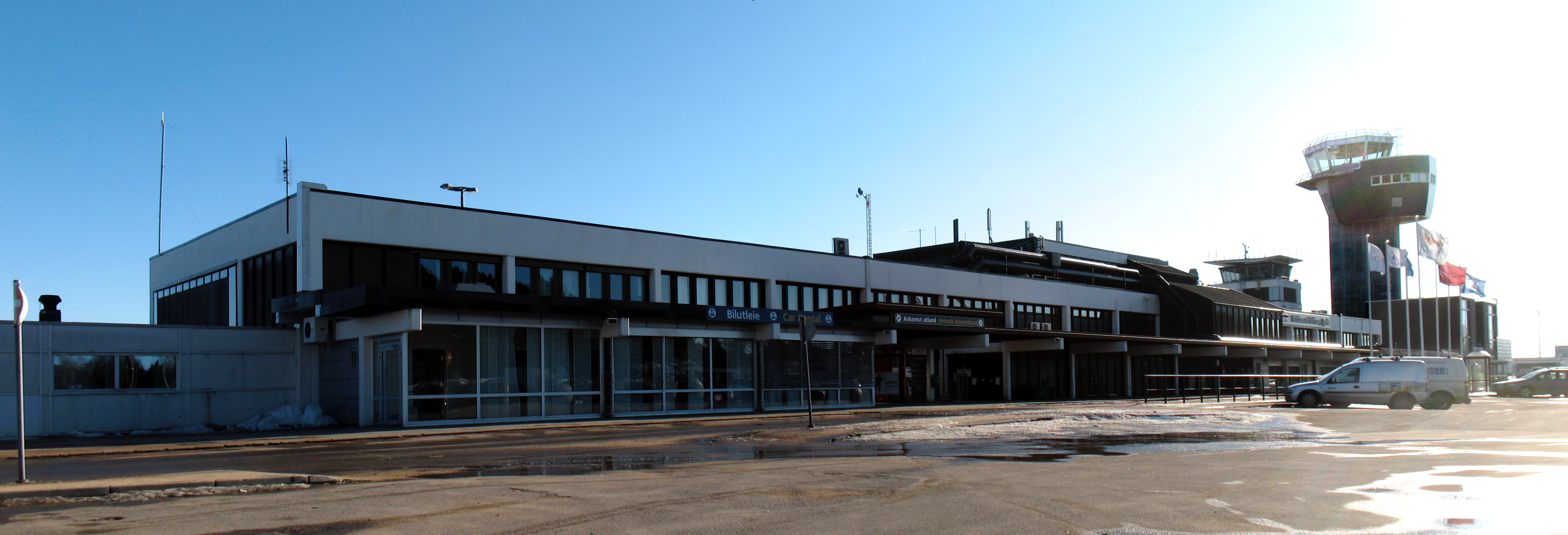
The terminal and control towers in 2013

Kristiansand Airport, Kjevik is situated on the grounds of the farm Kjevik at Tveit in Kristiansand, Norway. The asphalt runway physically measures 2,035 by 45 meters (6,677 by 148 ft) and is numbered 03/21. In addition it features a 90-meter (300 ft) engineered materials arrestor system at each end. The runway has a declared take-off run available of 1,986 and 1,969 meters (6,516 and 6,460 ft) on runways 03/21, respectively. The landing distances available are 1,920 and 1,870 meters (6,300 and 6,140 ft), respectively.

The aerodromes reference altitude is 17 meters (56 ft) above mean sea level. Kjevik has a category I instrument landing system in both directions, both which are equipped with precision approach path indicator. The airport has a category 7 fire and rescue service. The apron is connected to the runway via three taxiways, although none of these run parallel to the runway.

The check-in area consists of automated and staffed check-in stands, five car rental agencies and a Deli de Luca kiosk. The departure hall features a kiosk from the same chain and a duty free store. The latter also serves arriving international passengers. The airport has six gates, numbered 1 through 7. The first three can be used for international flights, with gate 3 able to also handle domestic flights, when it is numbered 4. The last three only handle domestic flights. None of the gates have jetbridges. Ground handling is provided by Aviator and SAS Ground Handling, while aviation fuel is provided by Shell.

== Airlines and destinations ==
The busiest route from Kristiansand is to Oslo Airport, Gardermoen. It is flown six times daily by SAS and four times daily by Norwegian using Boeing 737s. Other domestic routes are flown by Widerøe to Stavanger, Bergen and Trondheim. KLM Cityhopper flies twice daily to Amsterdam and Widerøe flies thrice daily to Copenhagen. SAS flies once per week during the summer to Alicante and Wizz Air flies twice weekly to Gdańsk.

Kristiansand Airport, Kjevik is the ninth-busiest airport in Norway. It served 1,061,130 passengers in 2018, of which 297,106 were international passengers. In 2018, the airport also saw 19,290 aircraft movements. Kjevik's catchment area covers Agder and is the only scheduled airport in the twin counties. For international flights, Kjevik experiences a leakage in western Vest-Agder to Stavanger Airport, Sola, and in Aust-Agder a leakage to Sandefjord Airport, Torp. These both have significantly more international services than Kjevik. Kjevik has significantly lower traffic than other airports in Norway covering similarly sized populations. A contributing factor is the well-established bus and train services to the capital.

Airlines	Destinations
Aegean Airlines	Rhodes
KLM	Amsterdam
Norwegian Air Shuttle	Oslo
Scandinavian Airlines	Copenhagen, Oslo; Seasonal: Alicante; Seasonal charter: Chania, Gran Canaria
Sunclass Airlines	Seasonal charter: Palma de Mallorca
Widerøe	Bergen, Bodø, Trondheim

== Statistics ==
Annual passenger traffic
Year	Passengers	% Change
2025	821,289	▲2.6%
2024	800,730	▼ -2.4%
2023	820,751	▲10.9%
2022	739,907	▲86.7%
2021	396,254	▲3.0%
2020	384,599	▼ -63.9%
2019	1,064,387	▲0.3%
2018	1,061,130	▲2.9%
2017	1,031,048	▲0.8%
2016	1,022,469	▼ -3.4%
2015	1,058,231	

== Ground transport ==
The airport is situated 16 kilometers (9.9 mi) by road from the city center. National Road 451 runs along the northern side of the runway and connects to National Road 41. It connects to the E18 freeway. The airport features parking for 1,800 cars. Car rental is also available.

Haga Buss operates an airport coach to Kristiansand. Nettbuss operates a coach service to Lillesand, Grimstad and Arendal. This is a direct service during rush hour and a shuttle service from a stop on the E18 the rest of the day. Agder Flyekspress operates a direct coach service to Arendal. Taxis are available at the airport.

== Bibliography ==
- Arheim, Tom; Hafsten, Bjørn; Olsen, Bjørn; Thuve, Sverre (1994). Fra Spitfire til F-16: Luftforsvaret 50 år 1944–1994 (in Norwegian). Oslo: Sem & Stenersen. ISBN 82-7046-068-0.
- Bakken, Rolf; Jæger, Ingrid W.; Krageboen, Sven (1989). Kr.sand lufthavn, Kjevik 50 år 1939–1989 (in Norwegian). Kristiansand. ISBN 82-991887-0-9.
- Ellemose, Søren (2009). Luftens helte (in Danish). Aarhus: Jyllands-Posten Forlag. ISBN 978-87-7692-197-2.
- Hafsten, Bjørn; Arheim, Tom (2003). Marinens flygevåpen 1912–1944 (in Norwegian). TankeStreken. ISBN 82-993535-1-3.
- Hall, Åke (2002). Luftens Vikingar – en bok om SAS alla flygplan (in Swedish). Nässjö: Air Historic Research. ISBN 91-973892-3-4.
- Hafsten, Bjørn; Larsstuvold, Ulf; Olsen, Bjørn; Stenersen, Sten (1991). Flyalarm: Luftkrigen over Norge 1939–1945 (in Norwegian). Oslo: Sem & Stenersen. ISBN 82-7046-058-3.
- Olsen-Hagen, Bernt; Gulstad, Anne Blix (2013). Kristiansand lufthavn, Kjevik – Dokumentasjon for arkivmessig bevaring (PDF) (in Norwegian). Norwegian Aviation Museum. Archived from the original (PDF) on 2016-03-04.
- Tjomsland, Audun (2005). Høyt spill om Torp (in Norwegian). Sandefjord: Tjomsland Media. ISBN 82-997212-0-2.
