= Sørfly =

Norwegian airline, 1946–1962

- Founded: 1946
- Ceased operations: 1962
- Operating bases: Kristiansand Airport, Kjevik
- Fleet size: 5
- Headquarters: Kristiansand, Norway

Sørfly A/S was a general aviation airline based in Kristiansand Municipality, Norway. It operated from 1946 to 1962 with a base at Kristiansand Airport, Kjevik. Sørfly operated a fleet of three Auster Autocrats, a Republic Seabee and a Miles Gemini.

For most of its history the airline provided aerial photography, target tug, air ambulance, passenger and cargo charter and sightseeing services as the baseline for its revenue. From 1948 to 1951 it also operated a scheduled service on behalf of Norwegian Air Lines from Kristiansand to Aalborg and Gothenburg, and to Stavanger.

== History ==
Sørfly was founded during early 1946 by four pilots and mechanics: Einar Jaatun, Ragnar Moi, Finn Erikstad and Jonny Thorsen. The airline immediately procured two Auster Autocrats. Operations in the first year focused on sightseeing. The airline would operate out of various communities selling aerial tours of the area. A specialty was pertussis-flights to soothe the sick with a steep dive. The third Autocrat was delivered in September.

Skis were mounted on one aircraft for the winter season. These were used for charter flights to the wilderness, mostly flying hunters to Setesdal. Other important contracts were transporting cement to Skjerka and target tug for the Royal Norwegian Air Force. The latter was a permanent contract which gave the airline an steady source of revenue.

The airline bought a Republic Seabee seaplane in 1947. This allowed the airline to start charter flights along the coast and access to mountain cabins during the summer. Sørfly signed a contract in 1948 to provide air ambulance flights.

Sørfly bought a three-passenger Miles Gemini in 1948 and used it to operate a scheduled service from Kristiansand via Aalborg Airport in Denmark to Gothenburg Torslanda Airport. From Kristiansand the flight was extended to Stavanger Airport, Sola using the Seabee. The flights were contracted by Norwegian Air Lines (DNL), who held the concession. These were negotiated year for year, which made it financially difficult for Sørfly to invest in a larger aircraft. The contract lasted until 1951, when DNL took over the service itself. The reason was that Sørfly had not been able to fly for a month during the preceding winter due to snowfall.

The airline thereafter attempted to use the closed Mandal Airport at Vestnessletta in Mandal as the basis for charter flights, but Mandal Municipal Council would not allow the reopening of the Second World War airport. The winter of 1953–54 had heavy snowfall and on 3 March 1954 the hangar roof collapsed. None of Sørfly's aircraft were damaged, although Kjevik Flyklubb's Piper Cub was. Sørfly bought this aircraft, restored it and sold it a year later.

Business continued to decline and in 1956 the Seabee was sold. Soon afterwards the target tugging contract was lost as the Air Force needed faster aircraft. By the turn of the decade several of the founders had quit and the airline was gradually shut down, with operations suspended in 1962. The last employee was Jaatun, who sold the remaining four aircraft in 1962 and 1963. The Gemini was retired by its ultimate owner in 1982 and was placed on display at the Norwegian Museum of Science and Technology. Ten years later it was transferred to Sola Aviation Museum.

== Operations ==
Sørfly was based at Kristiansand Airport, Kjevik in Kristiansand. It had its offices at a Luftwaffe barracks built during the German occupation and its aircraft based in a German hangar from the same period. The two main contracts were for air ambulance flights and for target tugging with the Air Force. Secondary activities included aerial photography, charter flights and cargo.

== Fleet ==
The following aircraft were operated by Sørfly:

Sørfly aircraft
Model	Qty	Built	First in	Last out	Ref(s)
Auster Autocrat	3	1946	1946	1963	
Republic Seabee	1	1947	1947	1956	
Piper Cub	1	1944	1954	1955	
Miles Gemini	1	1947	1948	1963	

== Accidents and incidents ==
The airline lost an Auster Autocrat in a write-off accident on 14 February 1947 at Risør.

== Bibliography ==
- Bakken, Rolf; Jæger, Ingrid W.; Krageboen, Sven (1989). Kr.sand lufthavn, Kjevik 50 år 1939–1989 (in Norwegian). Kristiansand. ISBN 82-991887-0-9.
- Hagby, Kay (1998). Fra Nielsen & Winther til Boeing 747 (in Norwegian). Drammen: Hagby. ISBN 8299475201.
