= Lista Air Station =

Lista Air Station Lista flystasjon
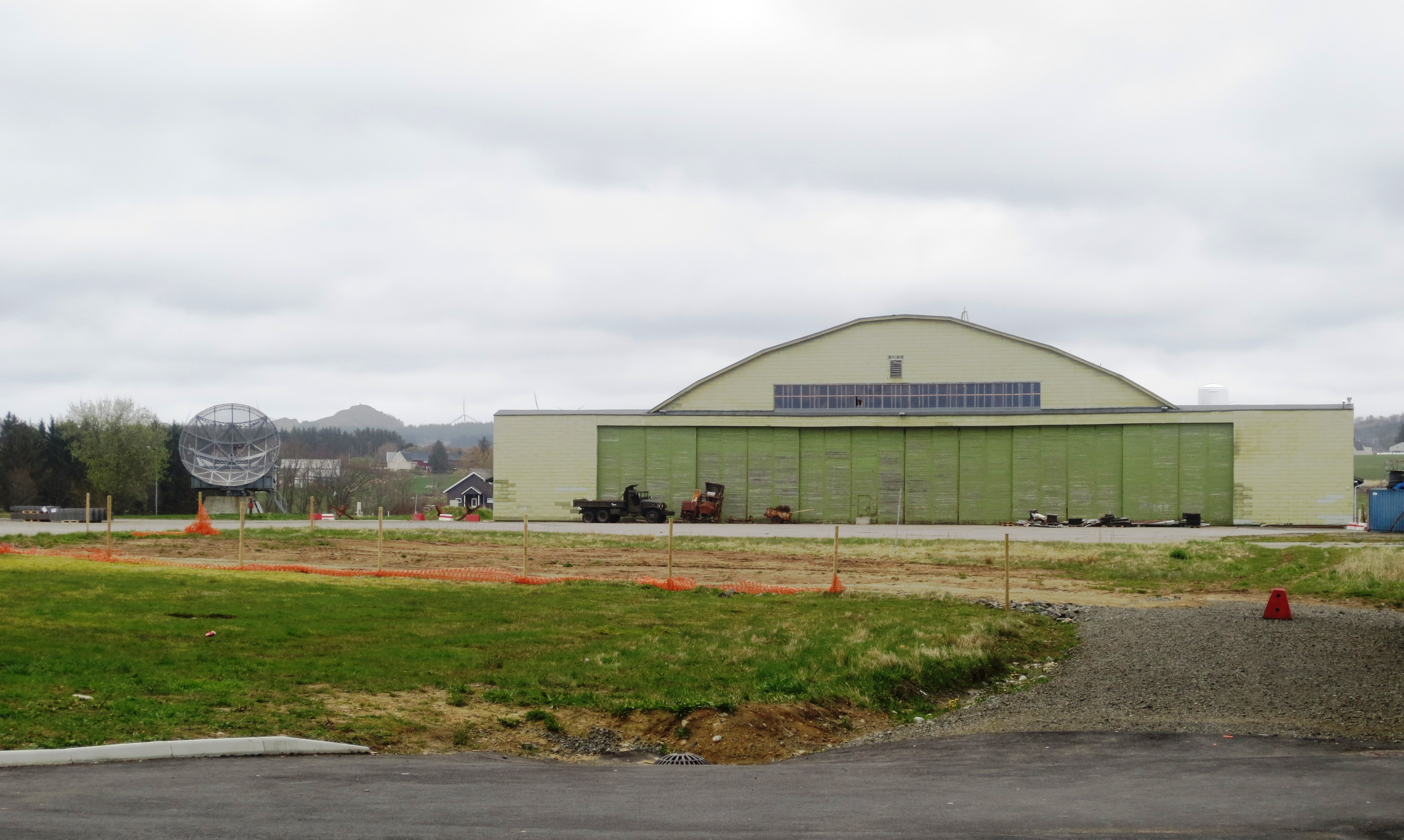
- IATA: FAN; ICAO: ENLI

Summary
- Airport type: Joint (military and civilian)
- Owner: Royal Norwegian Air Force
- Serves: Farsund, Norway
- Location: Lista, Farsund
- Elevation AMSL: 9 m / 29 ft
- Coordinates: 58°06′01″N 006°37′30″E

Map

Runways
Direction	Length		Surface
Direction	m	ft	Surface
14/32	2,990	9,810	Concrete
09/27	1,494	4,902	Concrete

Lista Air Station (Norwegian: Lista flystasjon, IATA: FAN, ICAO: ENLI) was a military airbase situated on the Lista peninsula in Farsund Municipality, Norway. It features a 2,990-meter (9,810 ft) concrete runway aligned 14/32, and a 1,521-meter (4,990 ft) runway aligned 09/27. The facility was shared with Farsund Airport, Lista, which remains in operation.

The airbase was built by Luftwaffe between 1941 and 1944, during the German occupation of Norway. Throughout the Second World War it was predominantly used for fighter aircraft and served as part of the Atlantic Wall. Most of the buildings at the station date from this period. It was taken over by the Royal Norwegian Air Force in 1946. It was at first closed and then reopened, originally serving a weapon-technical school and a shooting and bombing school. The latter utilized the shooting area at Marka.

Lista received North Atlantic Treaty Organization (NATO) funding for a runway extension, which was built between 1955 and 1959. Lista was designated a reserve airbase throughout the Cold War. The RNoAF's recruit school was located at Lista from 1963 to 1984. Thereafter it was mostly used for conferences. Lista Air Station was closed on 6 June 1996. The sale of the base, in which the military paid to the new owners to buy the property, resulted in a series of investigations and a change to the way the military sold properties.

== History ==
=== Establishment ===
The Norwegian Armed Forces never considered the suitability of Lista as an air base prior to the Second World War, despite its natural suitability in a flat, open landscape. The German occupation of Norway started on 9 April 1940 as part of Operation Weserübung. Lista was initially not prioritized by the Wehrmacht. The first landing of fifteen troops took place on 24 April, in an action to secure Lista Lighthouse.

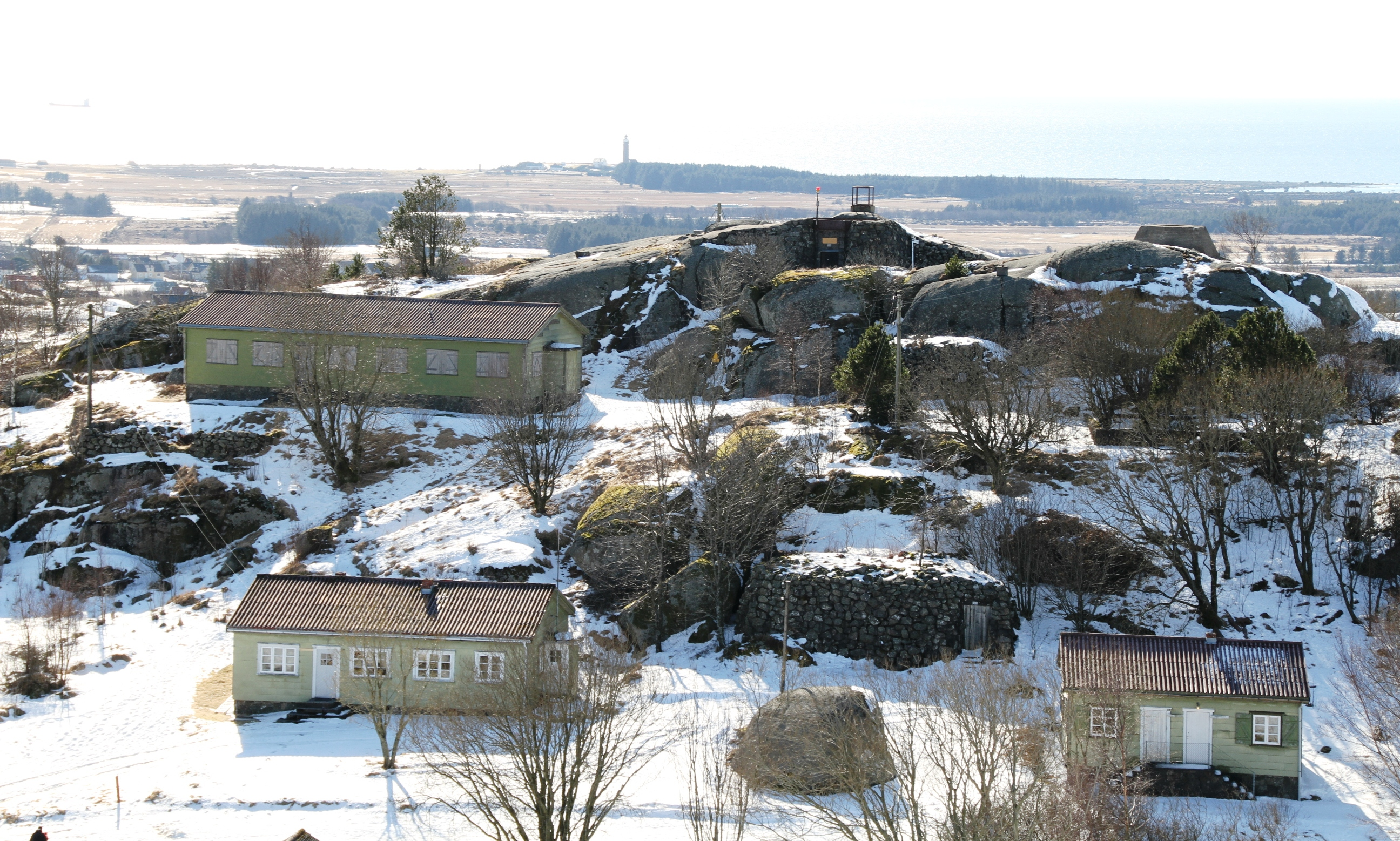
Nordberg Fort was located just north of the aerodrome

Lista was regarded as crucial to secure the safe transport of convoys along the coast. By 22 May 60 men had been stationed in Farsund. The first work on establishing defenses in Lista commenced later in the summer by the Kriegsmarine in what would later develop into Nordberg Fort and part of the Atlantic Wall. Guns were installed by October, making the coastal artillery operative.

The Luftwaffe's took control over Kjevik Air Station and Sola Air Station upon the occupation. They quickly assessed that there would be need for an additional airfield located between Kristiansand and Stavanger. Work therefore commenced on building Mandal Airport, which was completed in August 1940. By then Lista had been assessed as a more suitable location. Planning started in August and surveying was completed by the end of the month. The work was carried out by German personnel through Luftwaffe Bau-Batalionen and German contractors who hired Norwegian workers. Construction began on 2 September.

The runway was built in the area around Langåker and Stave. After leveling, a runway was built with prefabricated wooden elements. It measured 1,700 by 120 meters (5,580 by 390 ft) and westwards it reached the beach at Verevågen. It was at the time the longest wooden runway in Norway. The runway was completed in April 1941, allowing the first aircraft to land. Mandal Airport was closed and the aircraft transferred to Lista.

The first anti-aircraft defenses arrived on 27 December 1940, originally placing 88 mm guns at Vågsvold, Lista Lighthouse and at Stave. Four more positions were established in 1941. This was reorganized in 1943, when some of the units were moved out of Lista.

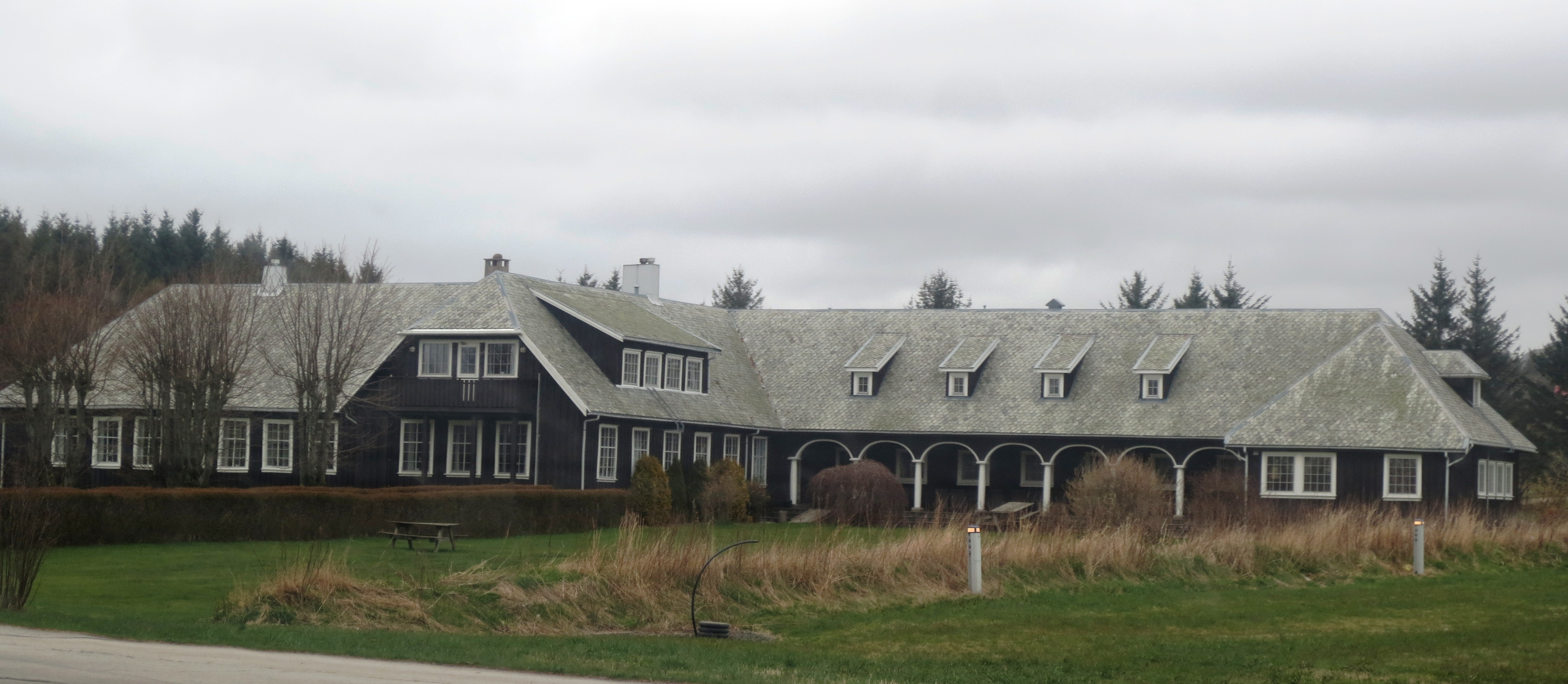
The officer's mess hall

Next work started on the main part of the air station. Contracted to Ed Zublin, the first part of the work was to drain the vast mires located throughout the peninsula. The terraforming proved difficult and work ran gradually for three years. Several smaller hills were demolished and moved to fill up where necessary. The landscape was dug out to create a series of drainage passages. The work resulted in a 1,571 by 80 meters (5,154 by 262 ft) concrete runway, in addition to 3,620 meters (11,880 ft) of taxiways and associated hangars, barracks and other buildings.

The work employed more than 10,000 Norwegian workers and several thousand Eastern Europeans. An industrial railway, the Lunde Line, was completed in April 1943. Two Würzburg radars and a Freya radar were installed at Lista from May 1943, along with one at Flekkerøy. Meanwhile, a bearing station and jamming station were also installed.

=== Luftwaffe operations ===
Lista Air Station was primarily used by fighter aircraft throughout the Second World War. Its main task was to provide support for the North Sea and Skagerrak areas along the coastline. The squadrons and aircraft stationed and dispatched to Lista varied over time, and often Lista was one of several airbases in Southern Norway used by a division at any given time.

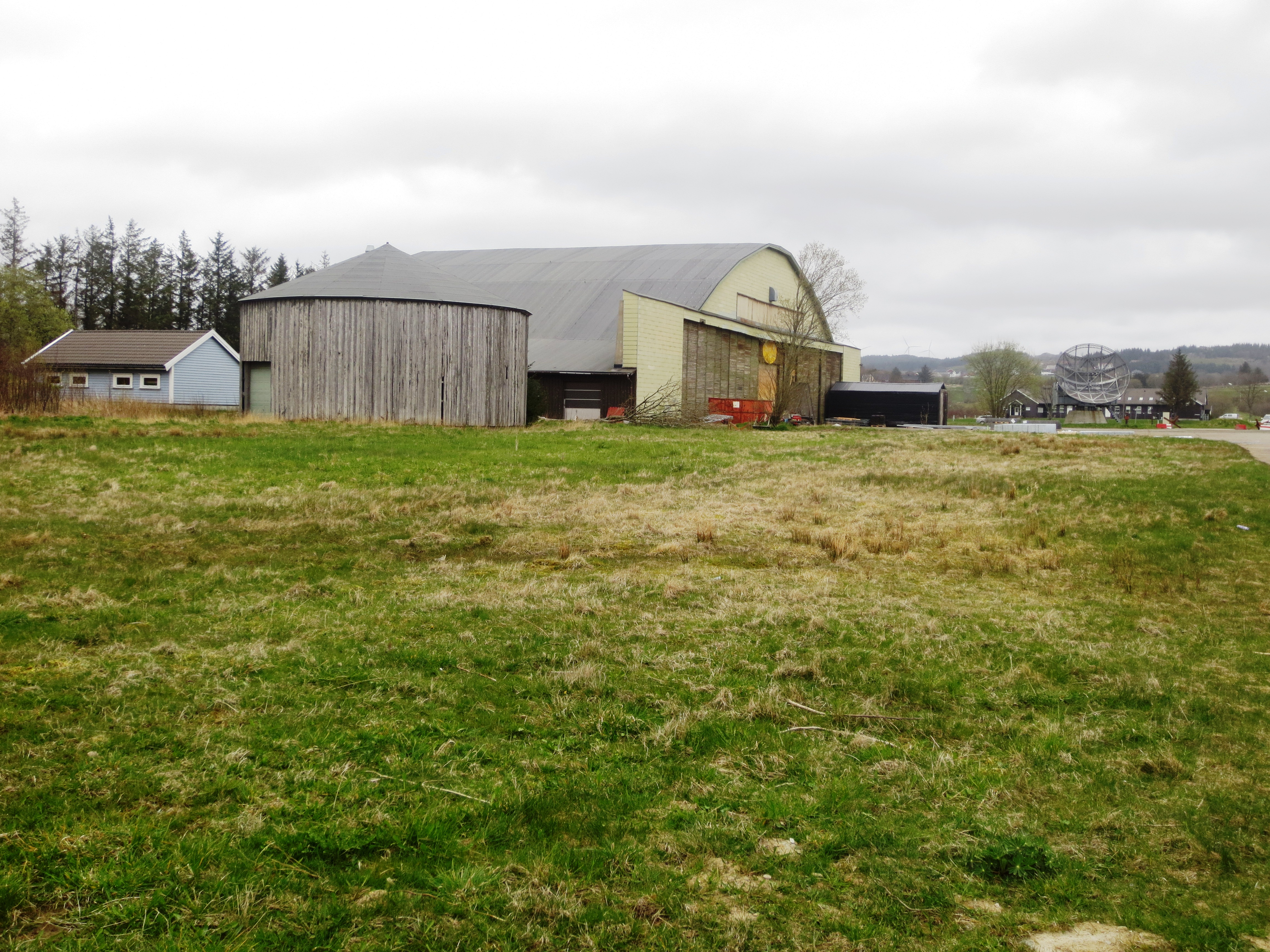
Hangar

The 2nd Group of Jagdgeschwader 77 (2./JG 77) was the first unit based at Lista, from March 1941. It became 2./JG 5 in January 1942. Lista was one of several bases used by the ad hoc Jagdgruppe Losigkeit to escort the German cruisers Prinz Eugen and Admiral Scheer along the coast in February. From August 1942 to March 1943 Lista was regularly used by 8./JG1, operating Messerschmitt Bf 109F and Focke-Wulf Fw 190A.

From August to October 1943 the base was used for 10./JG11 to escort convoys along Skagerrak using the Bf 109T. From October the base was used by a detachment of Seenotgruppe 5 using Dornier Do 24 seaplanes. From November 1943 to June 1944 Lista was the base of 11./JG 11 with Bf 109T. They were replaced in June with 10./JG 5 Messerschmitt Bf 110G and Nachtjagdstaffel Norwegian with Junkers Ju 88G and Messerschmitt Bf 110G, who remained until March 1945. These were sometimes supplemented with Zerstörergeschwader 26, also with Bf 100G. 13./JG 5 and 15./JG 5 and their Bf 109Gs were moved to Lista in November 1944. Luftflotte 1/120 used Lista for its Junkers Ju 88D and Junkers Ju 188F reconnaissance duties from December.

=== Royal Norwegian Air Force operations ===
Lista Air Station remained under German control until Royal Air Force troops arrived on 22 May 1945. The RAF retained control of the facility in November 1945, when it was transferred to the Royal Norwegian Air Force. During the RAF period their troops cleaned up the site, including minesweeping and destruction of ammunition and aircraft.

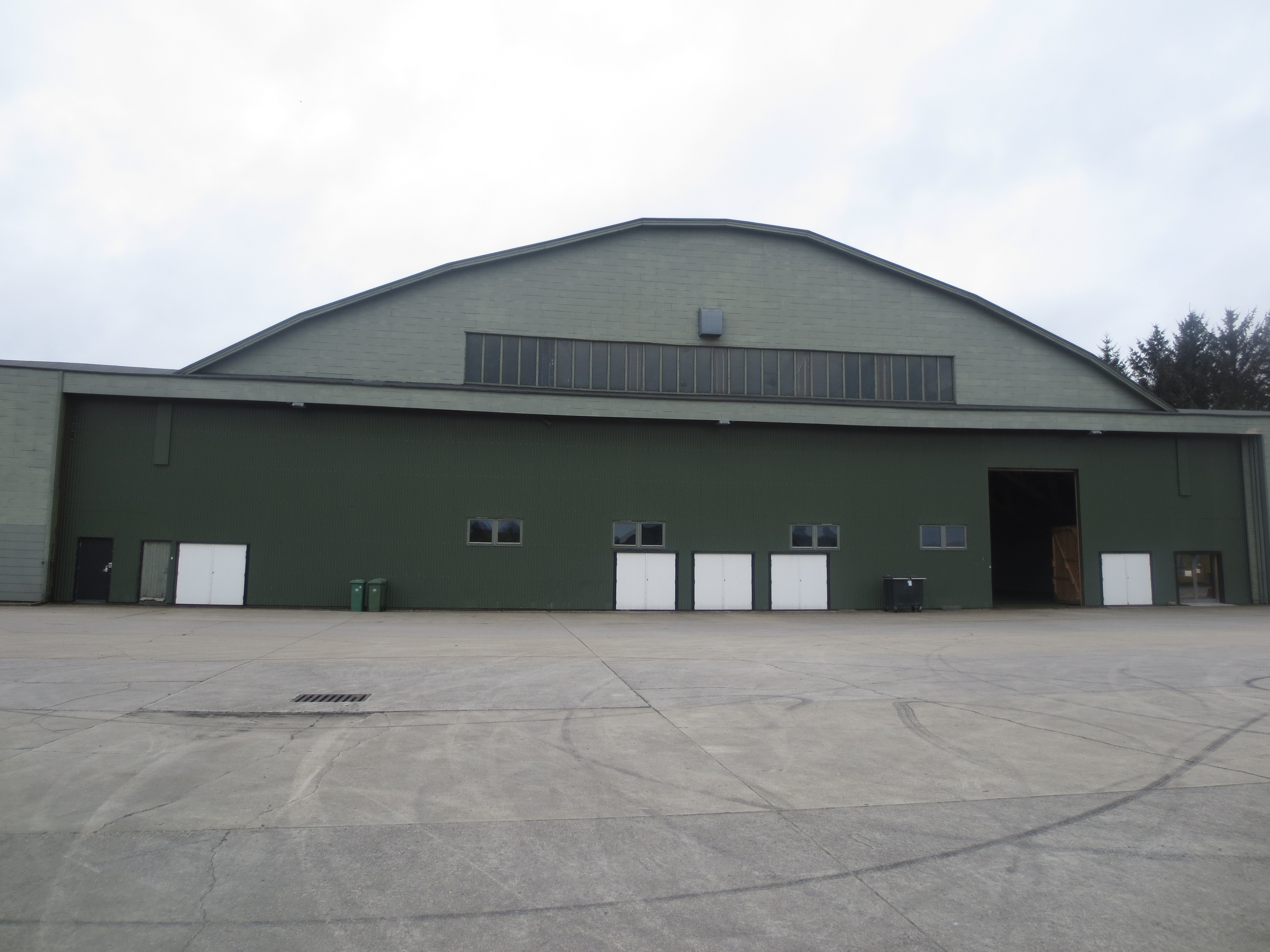
Three hangars form the Second World War remain today

The Norwegian military had no use for the entire encampment and defensive structures, and therefore most of the area was quickly returned to civilian use. However, the air station itself was of interest to the air force and was kept as a military installation. In December 1946 the military concluded that there was no need for the aerodrome and started the process of closing the facility. The wooden runway was dismantled and given as building supplies to the local population. Most of buildings were dismantled and moved elsewhere. The concrete runway was kept as an emergency airfield for civilian aircraft. Two of the major hangars burned down in 1947.

The air force concluded in 1948 that it needed to upgrade eight of the rudimentary bases which they had abandoned after the end of the war, including Lista. This was part of a strategy to spread out the squadrons in more locations. In particular, Lista was selected as a suitable site for parts of the air force's schools. This consisted of a shooting- and bombing school and a weapon-technical school. The latter opened in 1948 and the former the following year. They used existing German barracks for their quarters and two hangars for their classrooms.

The 100-hectare (250-acre) artillery range Marka was designated as part of the reopening, which was used both by the artillery and by the air force. It was commissioned on 1 March 1951. The artillery range was found to be unsuitable and instead the sand dunes of Jæren were preferred. The shooting- and bombing school was therefore moved to Sola in 1953.

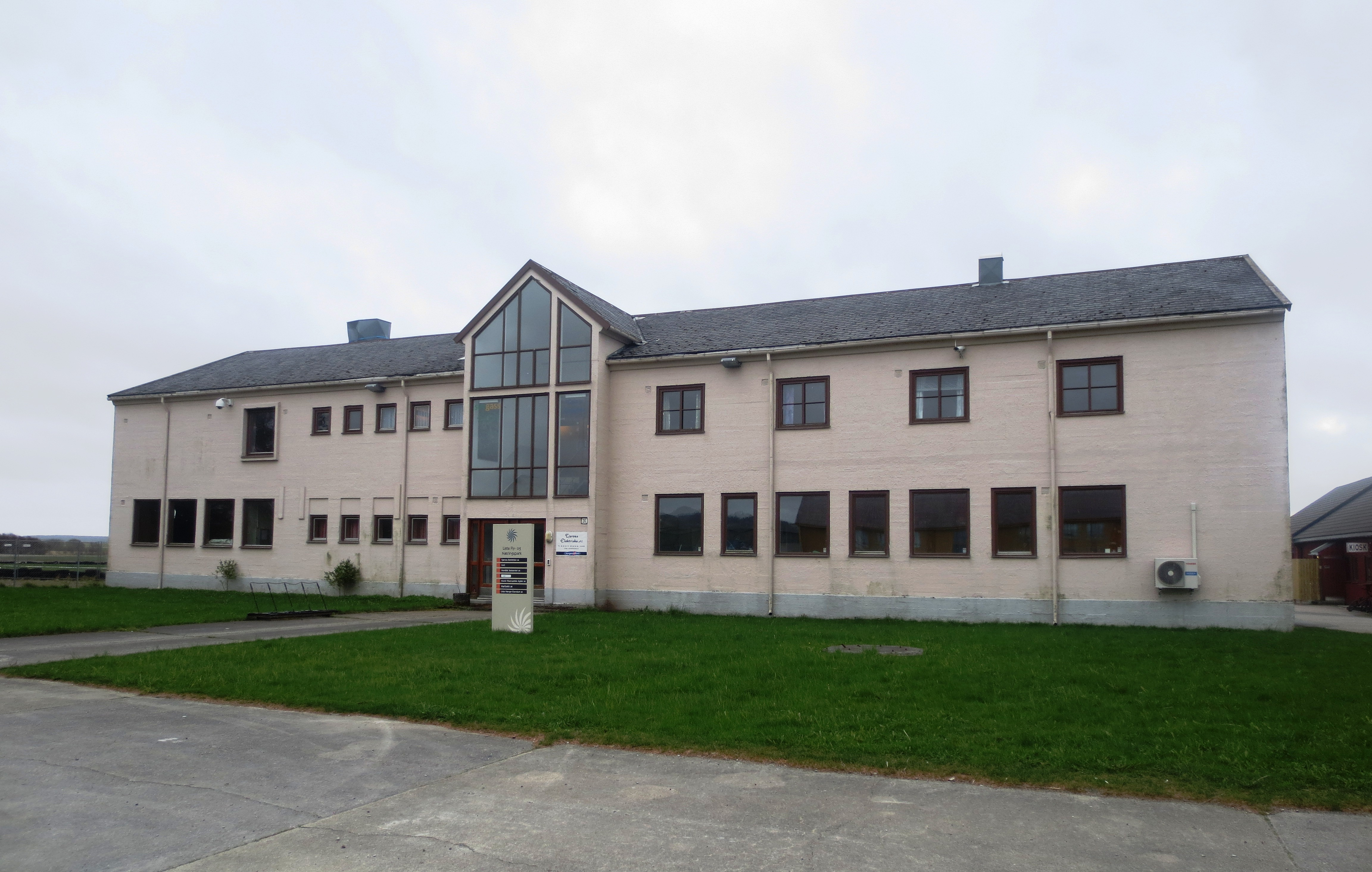
A former RNoAF building

Between 1955 and 1959 the base underwent a major redevelopment. Through funding from the North Atlantic Treaty Organization (NATO), List was designated a full-scale reserve base. This involved the construction of a new, 2,990-meter (9,810 ft) runway and taxiway and stands for two squadrons of fighter jets, each in a designated area. An anti-aircraft defense was established as part of the runway extension, manned by reserves and equipped with a Bofors 40 mm gun. The reserve status was never removed and the base was never home to any squadrons.

The air force's recruit school was moved to Lista in 1963, replacing the weapon-technical school, which moved to Kjevik. The latter was gradually closed down between 1982 and 1984 and moved to Gardermoen Air Station. However, due to the then large amount of new buildings at the station, it was used for courses and conferences within the military. It peaked at 12,000 guest-days. From 1988 to 1993 the Air Force's fire protection assistants were trained at Lista. This consisted of five courses per year, each of 25 to 30 pupils.

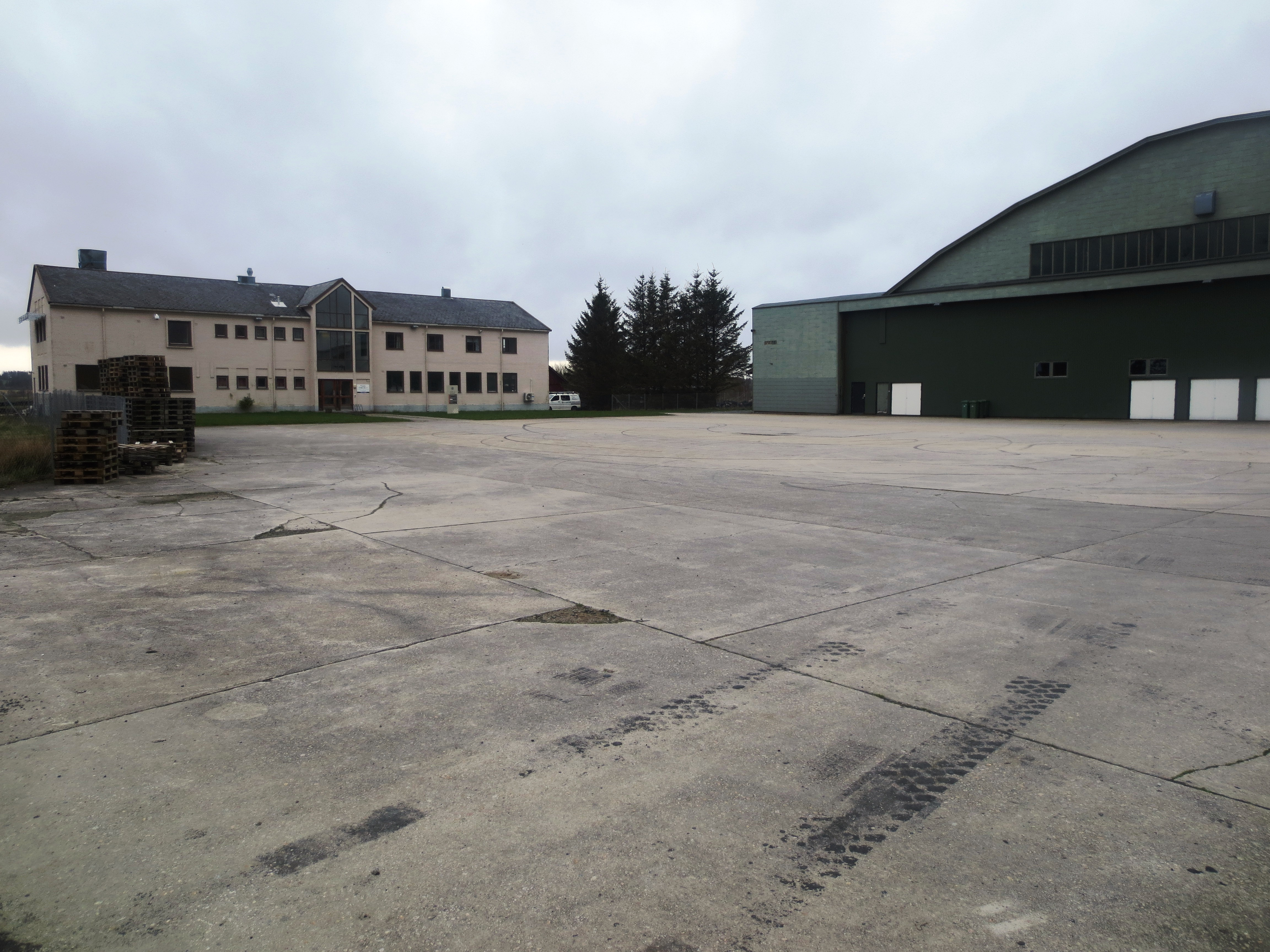
Hangar and redeveloped building

As part of the Oslo Airport location controversy, a 1988 report proposed that Lista be upgraded as an active air station, should Gardermoen be chosen as the new main airport. However, these plans were rejected by the Chief of Defence. Instead the base was upgraded to take in recruits for the Home Guard. Lista was upgraded Four new quarters were built, along with upgrades to the canteens, kitchens, storage facilities and classrooms. From 1990 it had a capacity for 232 recruits at a time, training them for six months before transferring them to reserve service in the Home Guard.

=== Closing ===
Due to the restructuring of the military in the 1990s, Parliament voted on 8 June 1994 to close Lista Air Station. Effective from 1 June 1996, the military was set to retain ownership of the facility for ten years. Parliament granted the Defence Estates Agency the right to sell the air station for market price as part of a large-scale sale of defunct military estates. The condition was that any other state or public uses be given priority and that the sale take place through an open sales process.

In June 1996 the Defence Estates Agency signed a ten-year lease on the entire air station with the latter company for an annual rent of 10,000 Norwegian krone per year. The agency retained the responsibility to maintain the property. Lista Lufthavn received an option for the company to buy the entire facility for NOK 25 million. In 1999 the agency were in talks with Farsund Municipality, but stipulated a sales price of NOK 200 million. The municipality therefore withdrew their interest. The agency sold the air station to Lista Flypark. They took over ownership on 9 December 2002.

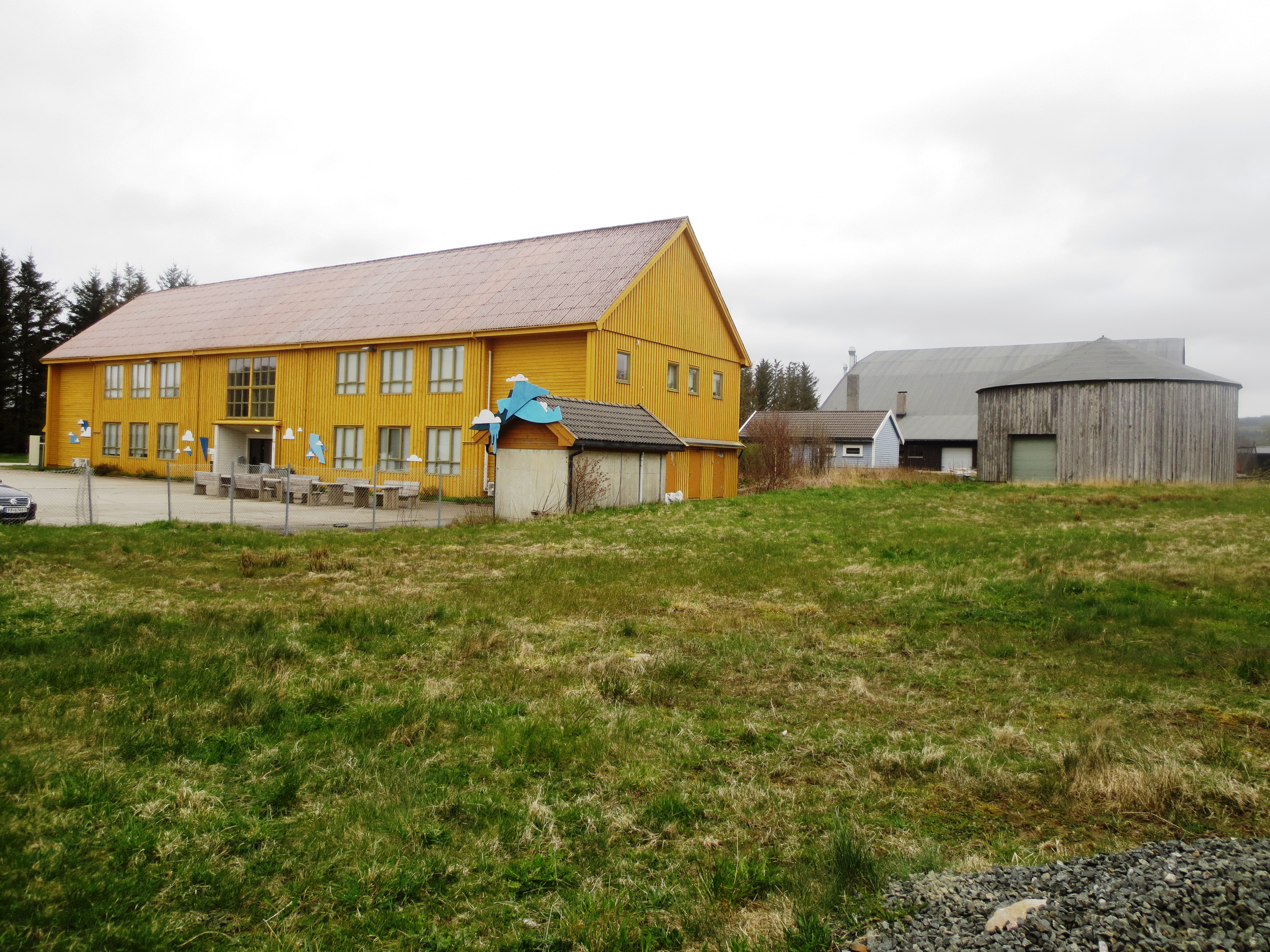
Military building since redeveloped to civilian use

The air station was valuated at NOK 11 million, yet sold for NOK 3.5 million. There was no documentation for why this discount was given. Both Lista Lufthavn and Lista Flypark's contracts were so structured that they had incentives to delay any commercial development of the property. The sale was carried out without public announcement. Eight sections were also sold between 1998 and 2003 without announcement. Avinor asked to take over the control tower and the Directorate for Nature Management asked to take over Slevdalsvannet, but both of these requests were ignored.

All in all the military spent NOK 53 million on the process of selling the property. Subtracted the sales price, this was what the military spend on operating the base after closure, maintaining it and in various discounts to purchasers for them to fix up the base after the sale took place. The scandal resulted in Parliament changing the sales procedures so that they had to be approved of by the government. The Defence Estates Agency retrospectively admitted their mistake and restructured their processes and organization to better handle sales and avoid future scandals.

Most of the base has been listed as a cultural heritage. This includes the runways, the taxiway and the road network, the remaining buildings from the Second World War and Marka. An important aspect when listing was that many of the structures had not been modified since the war. Slevdalsvannet Nature Reserve is situated southwest of the runway. A former lake, it has since been drained. It remains an important wetland area for migratory birds and is part of a Ramsar site. The nature reserve was established in 2005 and in 2014 three small lakes were artificially recreated. The site was bought by the Ministry of the Environment in 2013.

== Facilities ==
Farsund Airport, Lista is situated on the flat section of the Lista peninsula in Farsund, Norway. It is situated between the villages of Vanse and Vestbygd, and 12 kilometers (7.5 mi) from Farsund. The aerodrome has a reference elevation of 9 meters (30 ft) above mean sea level.

=== Second World War ===
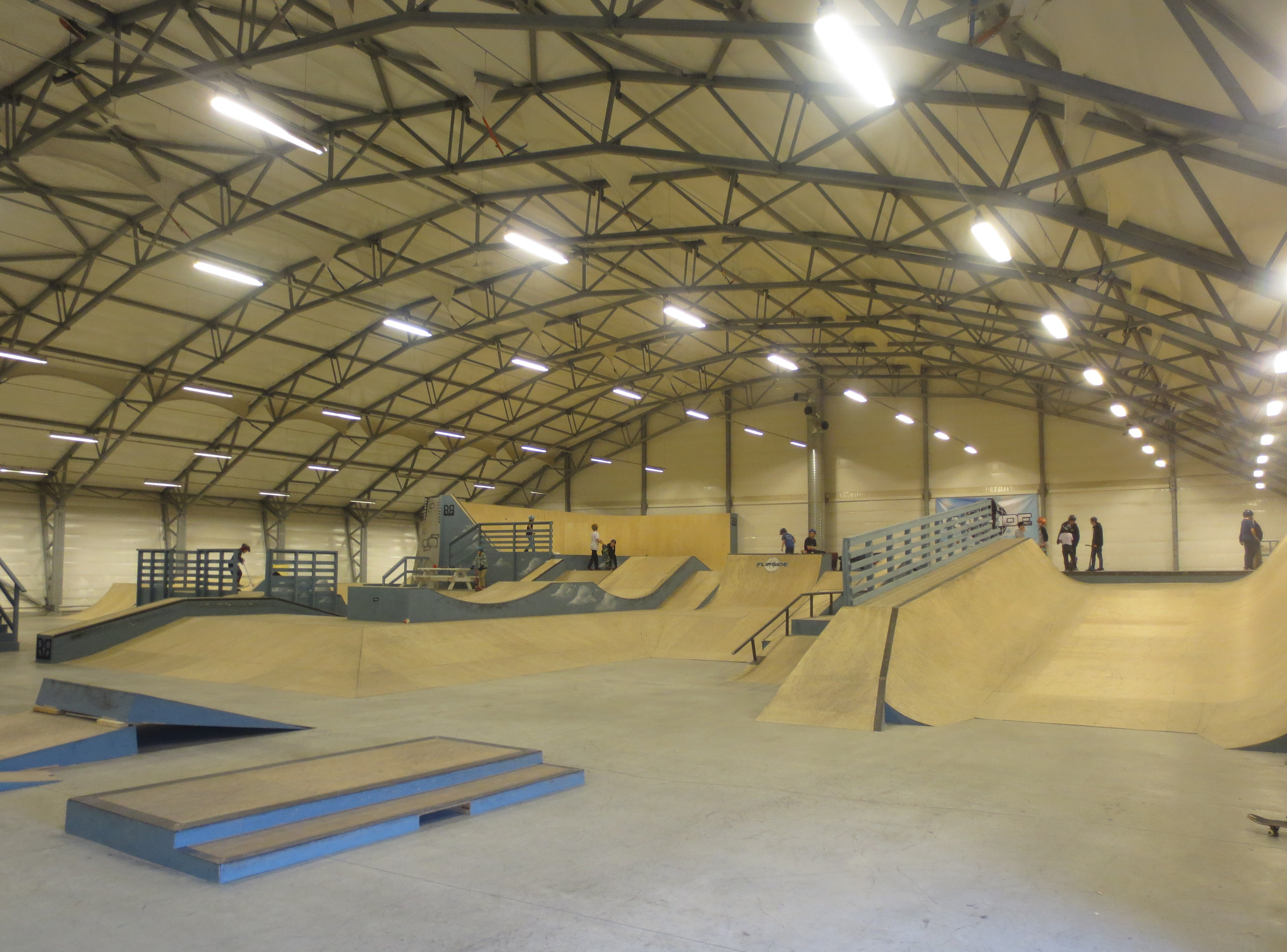
The interior of one of the hangars, since redeveloped to a skating park

During the Luftwaffe period the airport was gradually built out, changing character over time. The main runway was concrete and measured 1,571 by 80 meters (5,154 by 262 ft), aligned 09/27. It was connected via a network of taxiways which measured a total 3,620 meters (11,880 ft). Their width was 15 meters (49 ft). The runway was 80 centimeters (31 in) thick, while the taxiways were 25 centimeters (9.8 in) thick. A further 1,380 meters (4,530 ft) of taxiways were made of shingle. Aircraft stands were covered in shingle and wood. Around the airport there were twenty small protective hangars. In the western part of the aerodrome was a 1,700-by-120-meter (5,580 by 390 ft) wooden runway.

Most of the buildings at Lista Air Station were built during the Second World War. They were modernized by the RNoAF, but retained their original structure. Most of the buildings were of standard German design and were found both at other Norwegian and other Luftwaffe airports from the era. The operative headquarters were located at the eastern end of the wooden runway. Most of the buildings were located on the west side of the main runway. The facilities included offices, quarters, mess halls, storage buildings, a cinema and storage areas. The most elaborate building is the officer's mess, which remains today as a listed building. The two-story building features a roofed colonnade, a hipped roof and cob-worked log walls. The entire base consisted of about 300 buildings. The airbase and surrounding area were connected by a narrow-gauge railway, the Lunde Line.

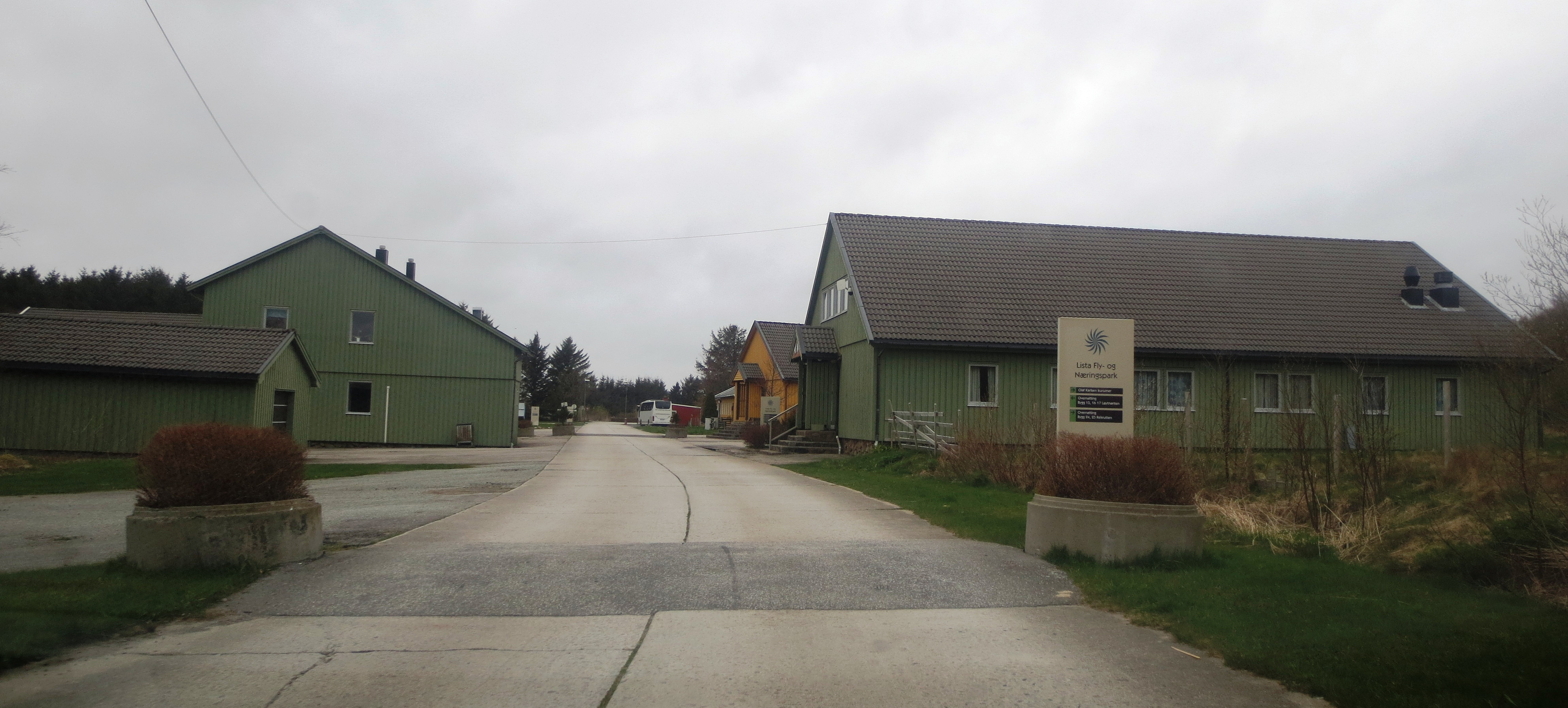
Remaining barracks

The location of the anti-aircraft defenses varied throughout the Second World War. Flak positions were at various times situated at Vågsvold, Dyngvold, Tjøvrenes, Lista Lighthouse, Venneim, Steinodden, Torp, Østre Hauge, Tjørveneset, Stave and Farsund. These were predominantly 8.8 cm guns, supplemented with 3.7 cm guns and 2.0 cm guns. The various flak positions were built with bunkers serving as quarters and support.

The site had a radar complex named "Wolf" situated in Marka. It consisted of two Würzburg radars, one Freya radar and a Wassermann radar, situated on the site of Farsund Radio. A second Wassermann radar was located at Grimsby. These were used both for detection and to aid fighters during night operations. Communications with fighters took place by a transmitter at Vere, which had a range of 200 kilometers (120 mi). The site also featured a bearing station and a jamming station.

=== Cold War ===
Following the NATO expansion in the late 1950s, a new 2,990 by 45 meters (9,810 by 148 ft) concrete runway was built, aligned 14/32. Parallel to this runs a 2,500-meter (8,200 ft) concrete taxiway. This is a rebuilding and extension of the former wooden runway. The German concrete runway was kept, although relegated to serve as a secondary runway. The shooting field of Marka was located southeast of the aerodrome. It features twenty-four bunkers, including a commando bunker from the Second World War.

The facilities which have remained since the war and were still used at the end of the air station's operation were the hangars, the officer's mess hall and Mark. Three of the six main hangars have survived. These were standard German types. The one consisted of a lean-to roof supported by a truss. The other two had a semicircular arch roof. Both were built with wooden walls and roofs.

== Civilian sector ==
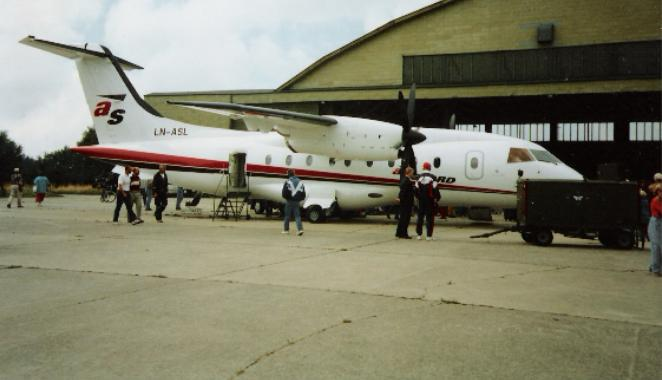
Air Stord Dornier 328 at Lista in 1996

Given the readiness of the infrastructure, Lista was selected as a suitable location for a civilian airport. Prior to the privatization the civilian operations were limited, typically with two trips each day to Oslo Airport, Fornebu and Stavanger Airport, Sola, and operations were carried out by the air force. Braathens SAFE started flights on 6 June 1955. With a few periods without services, they retained flights until 1980. Nordsjøfly, and its successor Norving, took over the routes, which lasted until February 1988.

After the privatization, Air Stord operated services from 1996 to 1999. An aerodrome flight information service was retained until 2007, although the airport saw very limited use. The main client was CHC Helikopter Service, who used it as a reserve base for flights to the North Sea. The main challenge for Farsund Airport has been the proximity to Kristiansand Airport, Kjevik and the limited catchment area which only covers Lister.

== Bibliography ==
- Arheim, Tom; Hafsten, Bjørn; Olsen, Bjørn; Thuve, Sverre (1994). Fra Spitfire til F-16: Luftforsvaret 50 år 1944–1994 (in Norwegian). Oslo: Sem & Stenersen. ISBN 82-7046-068-0.
- Ettrup, Erik; Schellenbergen, Daniel; Ritterbach, Erik (2007). Festung Lista (in Norwegian and German). Sandnes: Commentum Forlag. ISBN 978-82-92309-71-1.
- Gustavsen, Roar (2014). Flyplasshåndbok for Farsund lufthavn, Lista (PDF) (in Norwegian). Farsund: Lista Lufthavn. Archived from the original (PDF) on 25 December 2014.
- Hjelmeland, Britt-Elise (2000). Landsverneplan for Forsvaret : verneplan for eiendommer, bygninger og anlegg : Katalog Sør- og Vestlandet, Trøndelag og Nord-Norge (in Norwegian). Oslo: Forsvarets bygningstjeneste.
- Melling, Kjersti (2009). Nordavind fra alle kanter (in Norwegian). Oslo: Pilotforlaget.
- Office of the Auditor General of Norway (2005). Riksrevisjonens undersøkelse av salget av Lista flystasjon (in Norwegian).
- Tjomsland, Audun; Wilsberg, Kjell (1995). Braathens SAFE 50 år: Mot alle odds (in Norwegian). Oslo. ISBN 82-990400-1-9.
