= Denim Air =

Dutch charter airline

Denim Air ACMI
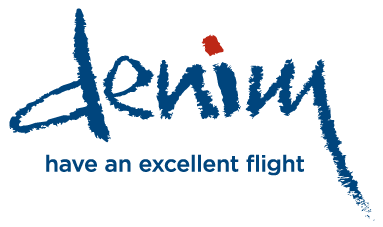

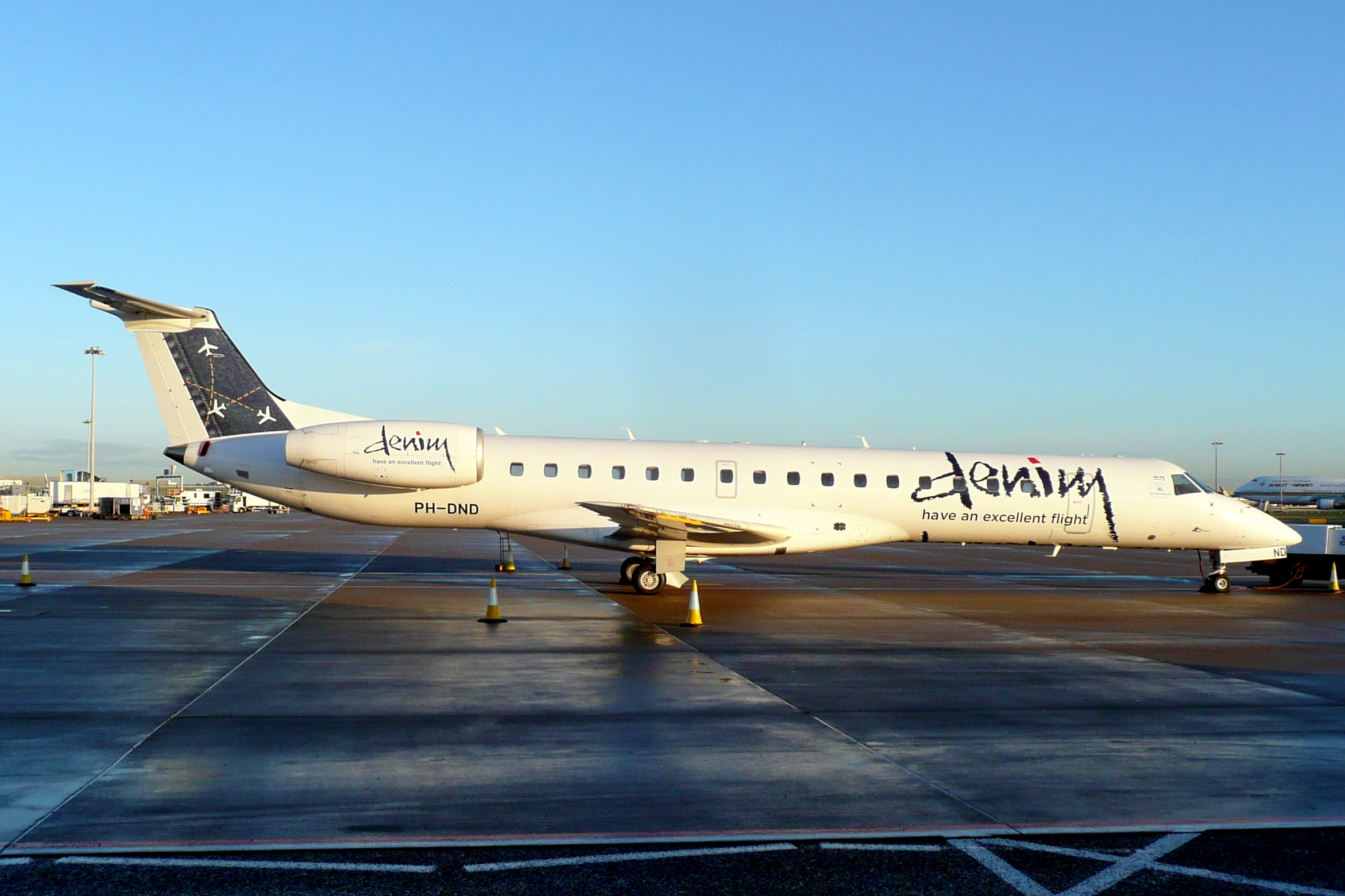
IATA	ICAO	Call sign
G6	DNM	DENIM
- Founded: February 1996
- Ceased operations: November 2016
- Operating bases: Amsterdam Airport Schiphol; Maastricht Aachen Airport
- Destinations: various
- Parent company: Sky Greenland
- Headquarters: Mijdrecht, Netherlands
- Key people: Gert Brask, CEO
- Website: denim.aero

Denim Air ACMI B.V. was a Dutch charter airline based in Mijdrecht. It provided ACMI wet lease services to other airlines. Its main base was Amsterdam Airport Schiphol. It was wholly owned by Sky Greenland and had 50 employees in January 2016. Denim operated full charters and under wetlease (ACMI) contracts on behalf of other airlines as well as governments and corporations. Its operations licence was revoked on 24 November 2016.

== History ==
This airline was established in 1996 and started operations on 26 April 1996.

Denim Air mainly targeted African, Asian and other willing markets, operating for the United Nation High Commissioner for Refugees in Sudan and Central Africa, for the Norwegian Army in Afghanistan, and for Veba Oil in Libya. The airline also operated aircraft for airlines, mainly African airline Arik Air and Spanish airline Air Nostrum. They also operated one aircraft for African airline Air Affaires Gabon.

On 18 February 2010, Denim Air ceased operations after all wet-lease contracts had ended within weeks and Dutch legal company De Vos & Partners was appointed as curator of wet-lease specialist Denim Air after it was declared bankrupt. A successful restart of the company was initiated as Denim Air ACMI or Denim in short.

In April 2015, Denim established FlyDenim as a new brand and corporate design for their charter operations. During the summer of 2015, the airline operated several new charter flights - for example from Manchester to Murcia and Innsbruck.

From December 2015 to February 2016, Denim operated domestic flights in Italy thanks to an agreement with the Italian tour operator Air Sud. flights from Reggio Calabria to Venice and Bergamo were operated with Fokker 100 and Fokker 50 of Denim's fleet. As of March 2016, all Air Sud's flights were suspended.

On 24 November 2016, the Dutch aviation authorities revoked Denim Air's operational license which subsequently led to the grounding of all of its flights. At the time, Denim Air operated its sole aircraft on behalf of People's Viennaline and was immediately replaced by Helvetic Airways after Denim Air's grounding.

== Fleet ==
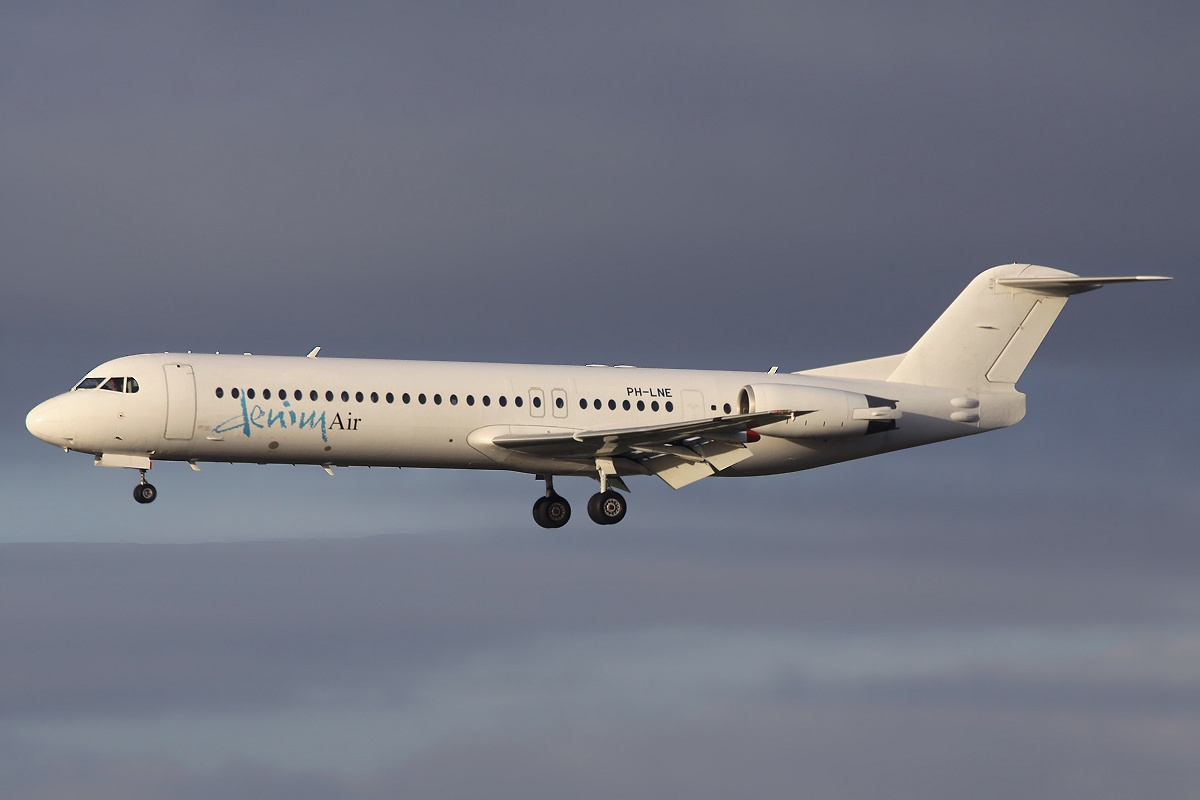
Former Denim Air Fokker 100

The Denim fleet consisted of the following aircraft as of November 2016:

Denim fleet
Aircraft	Total	Passengers	Notes
Embraer ERJ 145	1	50	operated for People's Viennaline
Total	1		

The airline fleet previously included the following aircraft:

- 1 Fokker 50
- 1 Fokker 100
