= Herad =

Herad may refer to: Business or Academy

- Herad Tower in JVC, Dubai, UAE.

== Places ==
- Herad, Buskerud, a village in Buskerud county, Norway
- Herad Municipality, a former municipality in Vest-Agder county, Norway
- Sande, Agder (also known as Herad), a village in Farsund Municipality in Agder county, Norway

== Other ==
- Herad Church (Agder), a church in Farsund Municipality in Agder county, Norway
- Herad, the Norwegian Nynorsk term for a Hundred (county division) or municipality
