= Lista Municipality =

Former municipality in Vest-Agder, Norway

Lista Municipality Lista herred
- Former municipality
- Vanse herred (historic name)
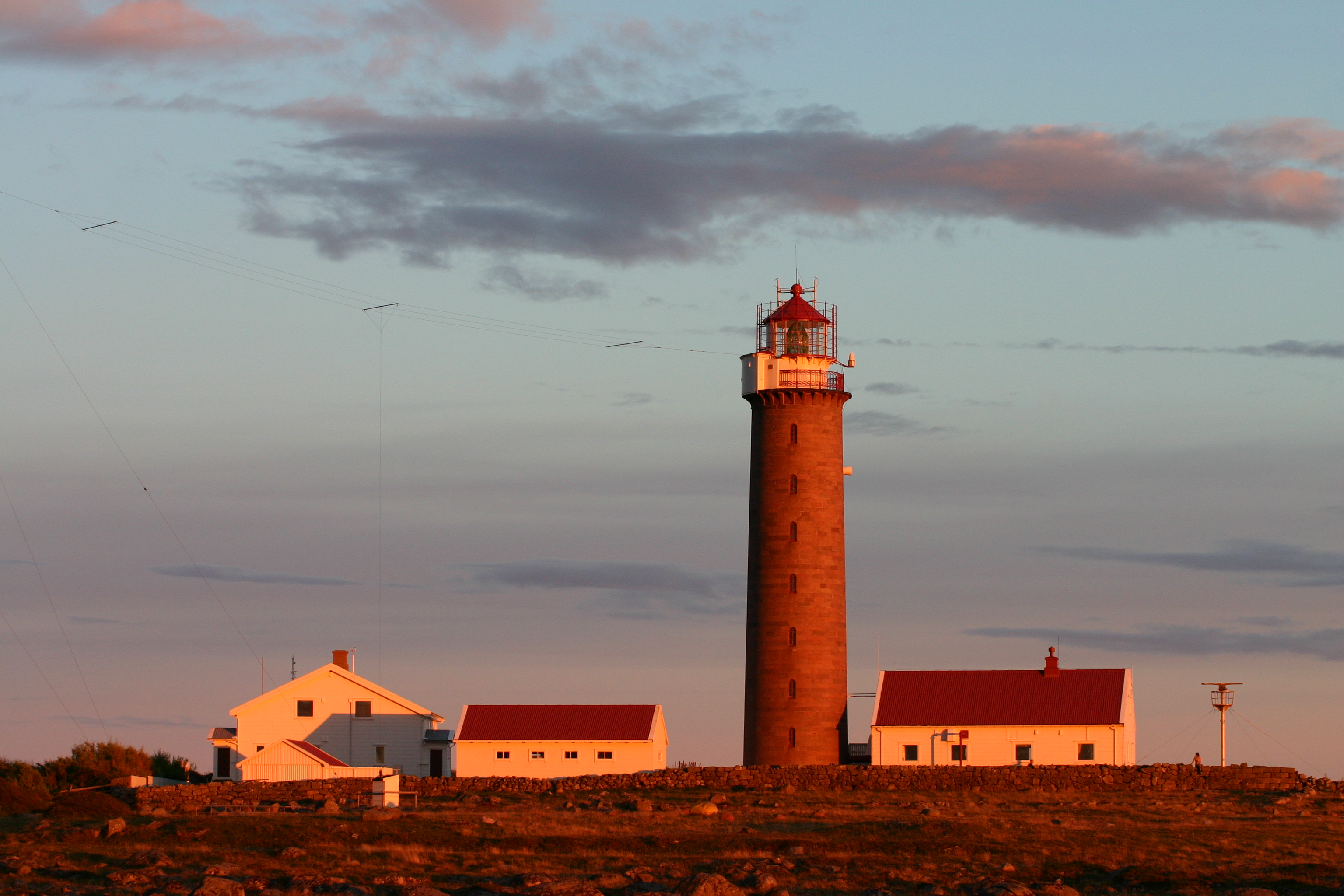
- Lista fyr (lighthouse)

- Vest-Agder within Norway

- Lista within Vest-Agder
- Coordinates: 58°05′43″N 06°47′37″E
- Country: Norway
- County: Vest-Agder
- District: Lister
- Established: 1 Jan 1838
  - Created as: Formannskapsdistrikt
- Disestablished: 1 Jan 1965
  - Succeeded by: Farsund Municipality
- Administrative centre: Vanse

Government
  - Mayor (1963–1964): Sveinung Tveit (V)

Area (upon dissolution)
  - Total: 139.3 km^{2} (53.8 sq mi)
  - Rank: #383 in Norway
- Highest elevation: 346 m (1,135 ft)

Population (1964)
  - Total: 4,562
  - Rank: #209 in Norway
  - Density: 32.7/km^{2} (85/sq mi)
  - Change (10 years): ▼ −6.4%
- Demonym(s): Listelending; Listring

Official language
  - Norwegian form: Neutral
- Time zone: UTC+01:00 (CET)
  - Summer (DST): UTC+02:00 (CEST)
- ISO 3166 code: NO-1041

Lista is a former municipality in the old Vest-Agder county, Norway. The 139.3-square-kilometre (53.8 sq mi) municipality existed from 1838 until its dissolution in 1965. The area is now part of Farsund Municipality in the traditional district of Lister in Agder county. The administrative centre was the village of Vanse where Vanse Church is located. Other villages in the municipality include Vestbygd and Loshavn. Lista Municipality was historically known as Vanse Municipality until 1911.

Prior to its dissolution in 1965, the 139.3-square-kilometre (53.8 sq mi) municipality was the 383rd largest by area out of the 525 municipalities in Norway. Lista Municipality was the 209th most populous municipality in Norway with a population of about 4,562. The municipality's population density was 32.7 inhabitants per square kilometre (85/sq mi) and its population had decreased by 6.4% over the previous 10-year period.

== General information ==
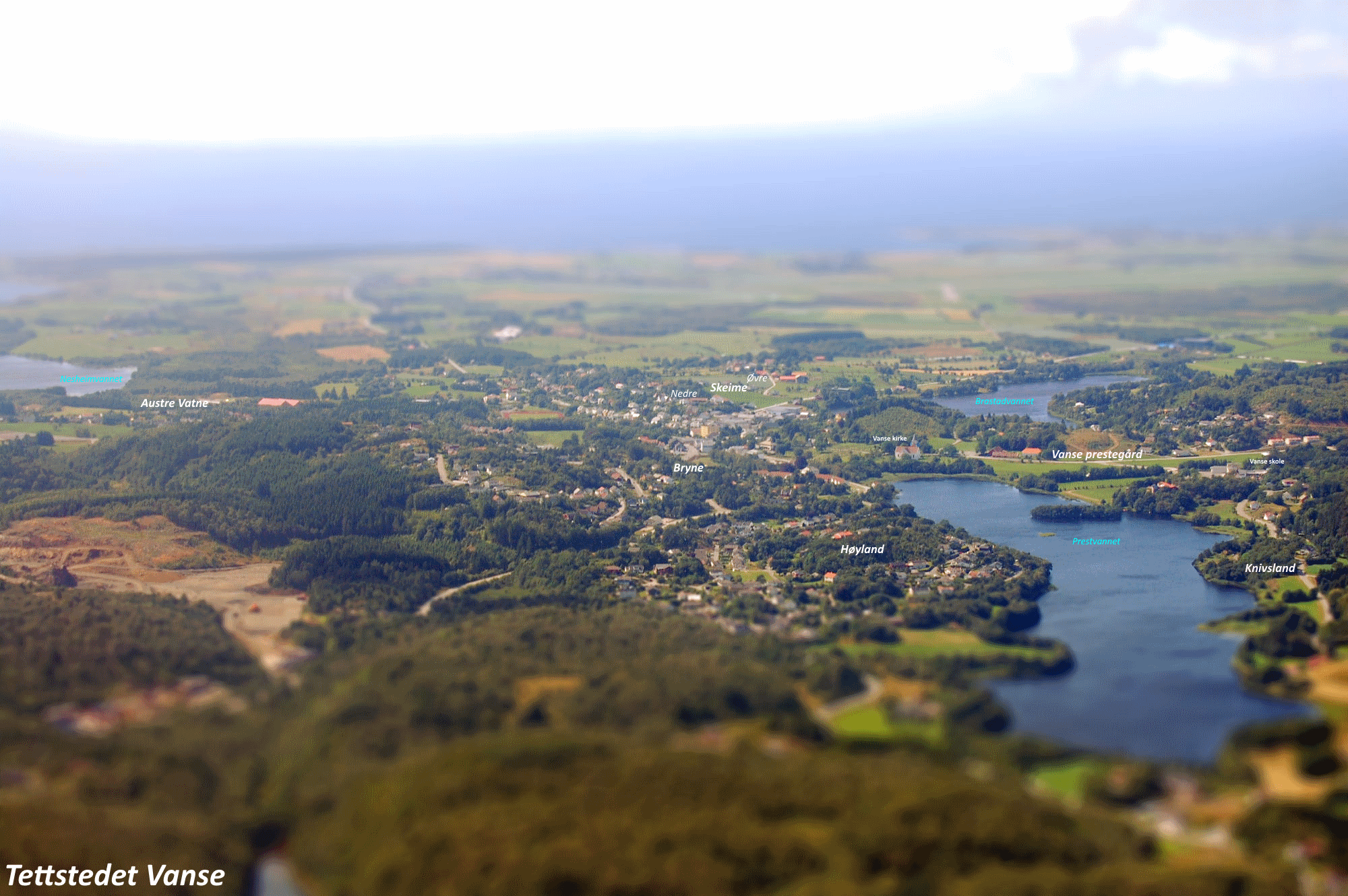
View of the Vanse area

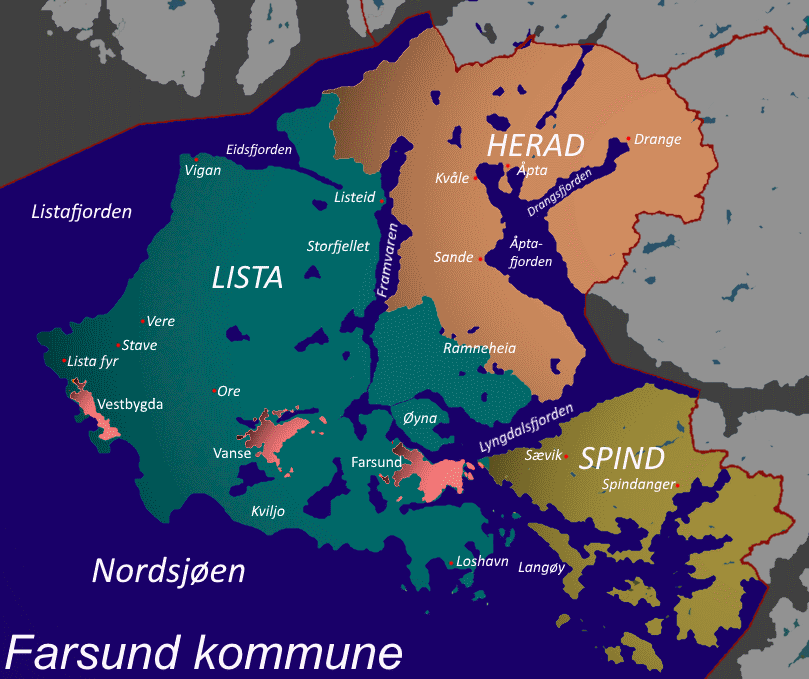
Map of the area in 1964

The municipality of Vanse was established on 1 January 1838 (see formannskapsdistrikt law). According to the 1835 census, the municipality had a population of 4,213. On 1 January 1903, an area with 99 inhabitants was transferred from Vanse Municipality to the neighboring town of Farsund. In 1917, the name was changed to Lista Municipality. Again in 1948, another area with 64 inhabitants was transferred from Lista Municipality into the town of Farsund.

During the 1960s, there were many municipal mergers across Norway due to the work of the Schei Committee. On 1 January 1965, Lista Municipality was dissolved and the following areas were merged to form an enlarged Farsund Municipality:

- the town of Farsund (population: 2,208)
- all of Herad Municipality (population: 359)
- all of Lista Municipality (population: 4,544)
- all of Spind Municipality (population: 606)

=== Name ===
The municipality (originally the parish) was originally named after the old Vanse farm (Old Norse: Vanesyn) since the first Vanse Church was built there. The meaning of the first element is uncertain. It is possible that the first element is derived from the plural of vanr which means "Vanir", a group of Old Norse gods. The last element is vin which means "meadow" or "pasture".

On 3 November 1917, a royal resolution changed the name of the municipality from Vanse Municipality to Lista Municipality. This was changed to bring back a modern version of the historical name for the area. The new name comes from the local Lista peninsula (Old Norse: Listi). The name comes from the word listi which means "border" or "edge", likely signifying its location on the southern edge of Norway. From 1662 until 1919, Vest-Agder county was named "Lister og Mandals amt", signifying the significance of the area. (The name Lista was misunderstood by Danish clerks as a plural form and therefore written with the plural ending -er.)

=== Churches ===
The Church of Norway had one parish (sokn) within Lista Municipality. At the time of the municipal dissolution, it was part of the Lista prestegjeld and the Lister prosti (deanery) in the Diocese of Agder.

Churches in Lista Municipality
Parish (sokn)	Church name	Location of the church	Year built
Vanse	Vanse Church	Vanse	1037
Vanse	Vestbygda Chapel	Vestbygd	1909

== Geography ==
Lista Municipality was located on the large Lista peninsula along the Listafjorden. The highest point in the municipality was the 346-metre (1,135 ft) tall mountain Storfjellet. Hidra Municipality was located to the northwest, Nes Municipality was located to the north, Herad Municipality was located to the northeast, Spind Municipality was located to the east, and the North Sea is located to the south and west.

== Government ==
While it existed, Lista Municipality was responsible for primary education (through 10th grade), outpatient health services, senior citizen services, welfare and other social services, zoning, economic development, and municipal roads and utilities. The municipality was governed by a municipal council of directly elected representatives. The mayor was indirectly elected by a vote of the municipal council. The municipality was under the jurisdiction of the Lyngdal District Court and the Agder Court of Appeal.

=== Municipal council ===
The municipal council (Herredsstyre) of ListaMunicipality was made up of 31 representatives that were elected to four year terms. The tables below show the historical composition of the council by political party.

Lista herredsstyre 1963–1964
Party name (in Norwegian)	Number of representatives
Labour Party (Arbeiderpartiet)	7
Conservative Party (Høyre)	7
Christian Democratic Party (Kristelig Folkeparti)	6
Centre Party (Senterpartiet)	3
Liberal Party (Venstre)	8
Total number of members:	31
Note: On 1 January 1965, Lista Municipality became part of Farsund Municipality.

Lista herredsstyre 1959–1963
Party name (in Norwegian)	Number of representatives
Labour Party (Arbeiderpartiet)	6
Conservative Party (Høyre)	6
Christian Democratic Party (Kristelig Folkeparti)	7
Centre Party (Senterpartiet)	3
Liberal Party (Venstre)	9
Total number of members:	31

Lista herredsstyre 1955–1959
Party name (in Norwegian)	Number of representatives
Labour Party (Arbeiderpartiet)	5
Conservative Party (Høyre)	6
Christian Democratic Party (Kristelig Folkeparti)	6
Farmers' Party (Bondepartiet)	3
Liberal Party (Venstre)	8
Local List(s) (Lokale lister)	3
Total number of members:	31

Lista herredsstyre 1951–1955
Party name (in Norwegian)	Number of representatives
Labour Party (Arbeiderpartiet)	4
Conservative Party (Høyre)	7
Christian Democratic Party (Kristelig Folkeparti)	6
Farmers' Party (Bondepartiet)	2
Liberal Party (Venstre)	10
Local List(s) (Lokale lister)	3
Total number of members:	32

Lista herredsstyre 1947–1951
Party name (in Norwegian)	Number of representatives
Labour Party (Arbeiderpartiet)	3
Conservative Party (Høyre)	8
Christian Democratic Party (Kristelig Folkeparti)	5
Farmers' Party (Bondepartiet)	2
Joint list of the Liberal Party (Venstre) and the Radical People's Party (Radikale Folkepartiet)	10
Local List(s) (Lokale lister)	4
Total number of members:	32

Lista herredsstyre 1945–1947
Party name (in Norwegian)	Number of representatives
Labour Party (Arbeiderpartiet)	6
Conservative Party (Høyre)	5
Christian Democratic Party (Kristelig Folkeparti)	7
Farmers' Party (Bondepartiet)	2
Joint list of the Liberal Party (Venstre) and the Radical People's Party (Radikale Folkepartiet)	8
Local List(s) (Lokale lister)	4
Total number of members:	32

Lista herredsstyre 1937–1941*
Party name (in Norwegian)	Number of representatives
Labour Party (Arbeiderpartiet)	3
Conservative Party (Høyre)	10
Farmers' Party (Bondepartiet)	4
Liberal Party (Venstre)	10
Local List(s) (Lokale lister)	1
Total number of members:	32
Note: Due to the German occupation of Norway during World War II, no elections were held for new municipal councils until after the war ended in 1945.

=== Mayors ===
The mayor (Norwegian: ordfører) of Lista Municipality was the political leader of the municipality and the chairperson of the municipal council. The following people have held this position:

- 1838–1843: Christian Schønning Wulff
- 1844–1845: Lars Andreas Jensen Meberg
- 1846–1849: Aslag Reiersen
- 1850–1853: Lars Andreas Jensen Meberg
- 1854–1857: Aslag Reiersen
- 1858–1859: Aanen Olsen Bergsager
- 1860–1865: Jørgen Ottesen
- 1866–1867: Bernt Ludvig Nielsen
- 1868–1869: Lars Severin Jensen Vinnem
- 1870–1871: Reinert Aslagsen
- 1872–1877: Adolf Fredriksen
- 1878–1889: Johan Julius Olsen
- 1890–1891: Adolf Fredriksen (H)
- 1892–1898: Johannes. T. Østensen (H)
- 1899–1901: Abraham Theodor Berge (V)
- 1902–1904: Nils Mikal Abrahamsen
- 1905–1919: Ole Walaas Selvaag (V)
- 1920–1922: Karl Sanne (H)
- 1923–1925: Ole Walaas Selvaag (V)
- 1926–1931: August Skeibrok (H)
- 1932–1934: Adolf Østhassel (Bp)
- 1935–1937: Edwald Helvig (V)
- 1938–1940: Hjalmar Østensen (H)
- 1941–1945: Martin Vindheim (Bp)
- 1945–1947: Einar B. Nielsen (V)
- 1947–1947: Håkon Hansen (KrF)
- 1947–1950: August Skeibrok (H)
- 1950–1955: Andreas Emanuelsen (V)
- 1955–1963: Olaf Velle (V)
- 1963–1964: Sveinung Tveit (V)

== Notable people ==
- Evert Andersen
- Marquis of Lista

== See also ==
- List of former municipalities of Norway
