= Sande, Agder =

Village in Farsund Municipality, Norway

Sande Herad
- Village
- Interactive map of Sande
- Coordinates: 58.15806°N 6.79992°E
- Country: Norway
- Region: Southern Norway
- County: Agder
- District: Lister
- Municipality: Farsund Municipality
- Elevation: 17 m (56 ft)
- Time zone: UTC+01:00 (CET)
  - Summer (DST): UTC+02:00 (CEST)
- Post Code: 4550 Farsund

Sande or Herad is a village in Farsund Municipality in Agder county, Norway. The village is located along the Åptafjorden, about 8 kilometres (5.0 mi) north of the town of Farsund. Herad Church is located in the village.

== History ==
The village was the administrative centre of the old Herad Municipality which existed from 1838 until its dissolution in 1965. This is why the village is also known as Herad.
