= Vanse =

Village in Farsund Municipality, Norway

- Village
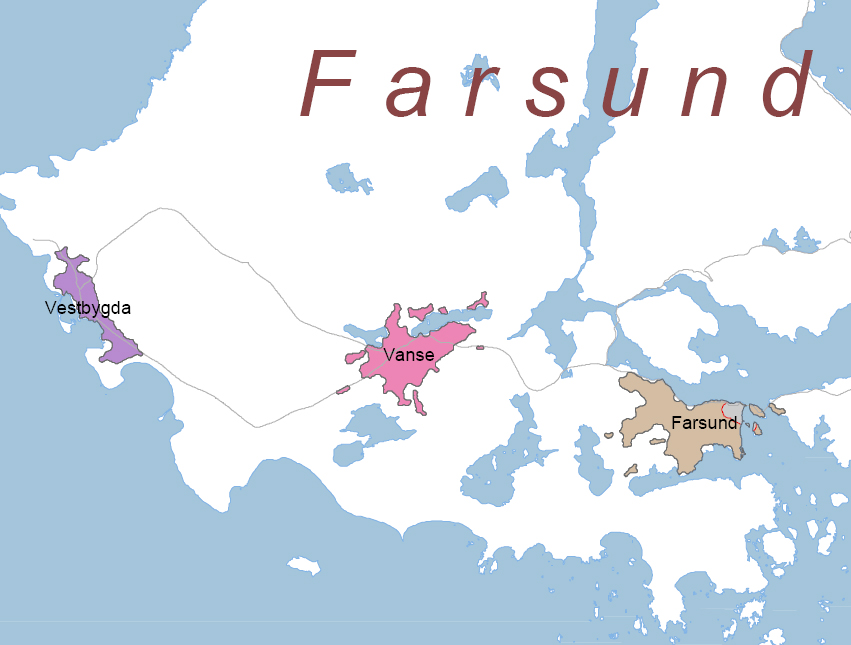
- View of the village location within Farsund
- Interactive map of Vanse
- Coordinates: 58.09472°N 6.69443°E
- Country: Norway
- Region: Southern Norway
- County: Agder
- District: Lister
- Municipality: Farsund Municipality

Area
  - Total: 1.94 km^{2} (0.75 sq mi)
- Elevation: 27 m (89 ft)

Population (2026)
  - Total: 2,075
  - Density: 1,070/km^{2} (2,800/sq mi)
- Time zone: UTC+01:00 (CET)
  - Summer (DST): UTC+02:00 (CEST)
- Post Code: 4557 Vanse

Vanse is a village in Farsund Municipality in Agder county, Norway. The village is located on the Lista peninsula about 4 kilometres (2.5 mi) west of the town of Farsund and about 5 kilometres (3.1 mi) east of the village of Vestbygd. The Farsund Airport, Lista is located just west of Vanse.

The 1.94-square-kilometre (480-acre) village has a population (2026) of 2,075 which gives the village a population density of 1,070 inhabitants per square kilometre (2,800/sq mi).

== History ==
The village was the administrative centre of the old Lista Municipality from 1838 until its dissolution in 1965. The old municipality was known as Vanse Municipality from 1838 until 1911.

Vanse Church is a medieval stone church, built in 1037 in the village of Vanse. A stone monument stands near the church. it is a memorial of fatalities during the Gunboat War (1807–1814). It is surrounded by authentic small cannons and a circle of stones with chain. A speech is held by this stone each year on Constitution Day, May 17.

== American connections ==
The village of Vanse, has many connections to the United States due to high emmigration from Vanse to the US. The American Festival is held in Vanse each year.

Kjell Elvis has his own star in Selvaagpark modeled on the famous Hollywood Walk of Fame.

== Media gallery ==
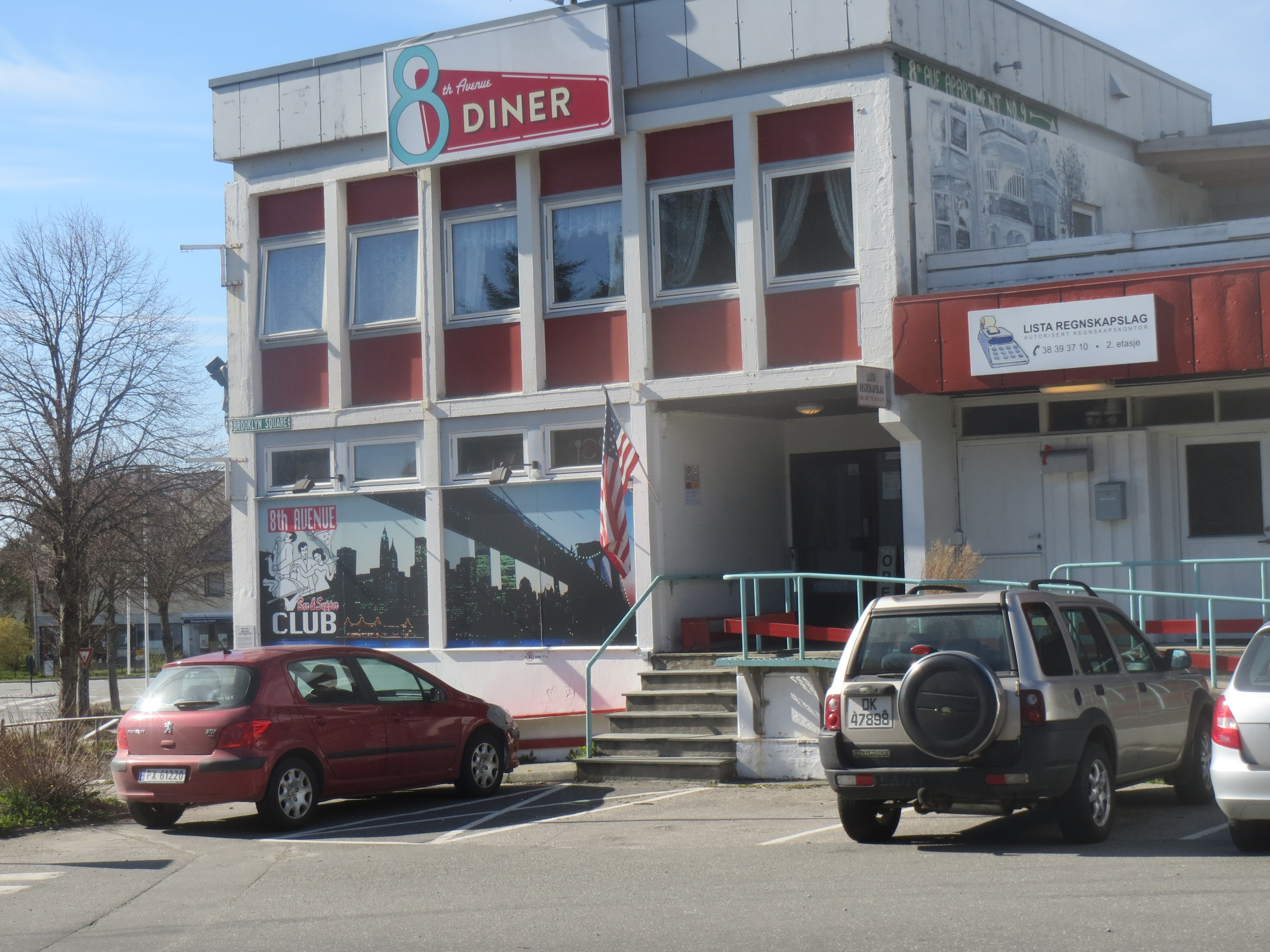
8th Avenue Diner in Vanse

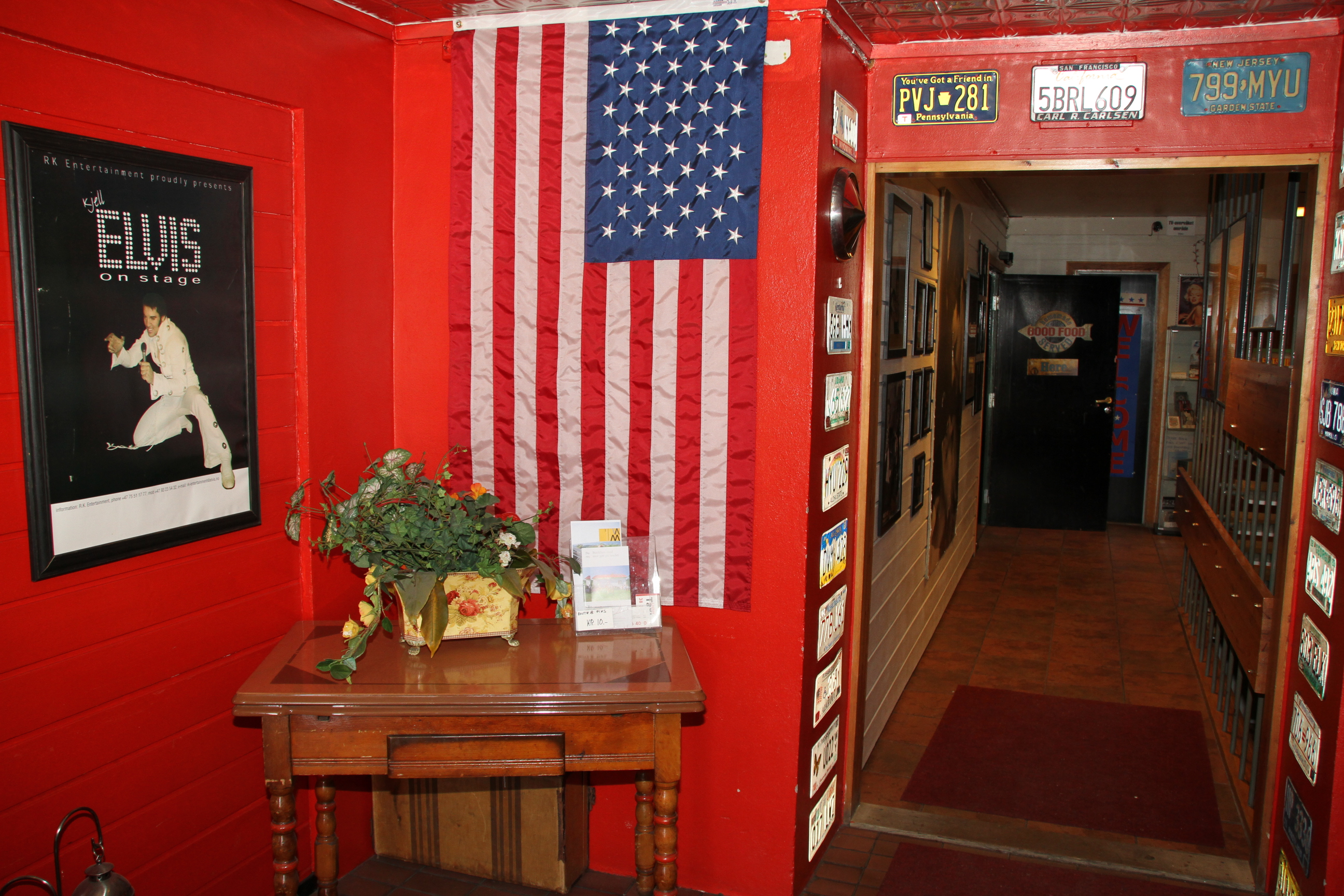
The hall of 8th Avenue Diner, Vanse

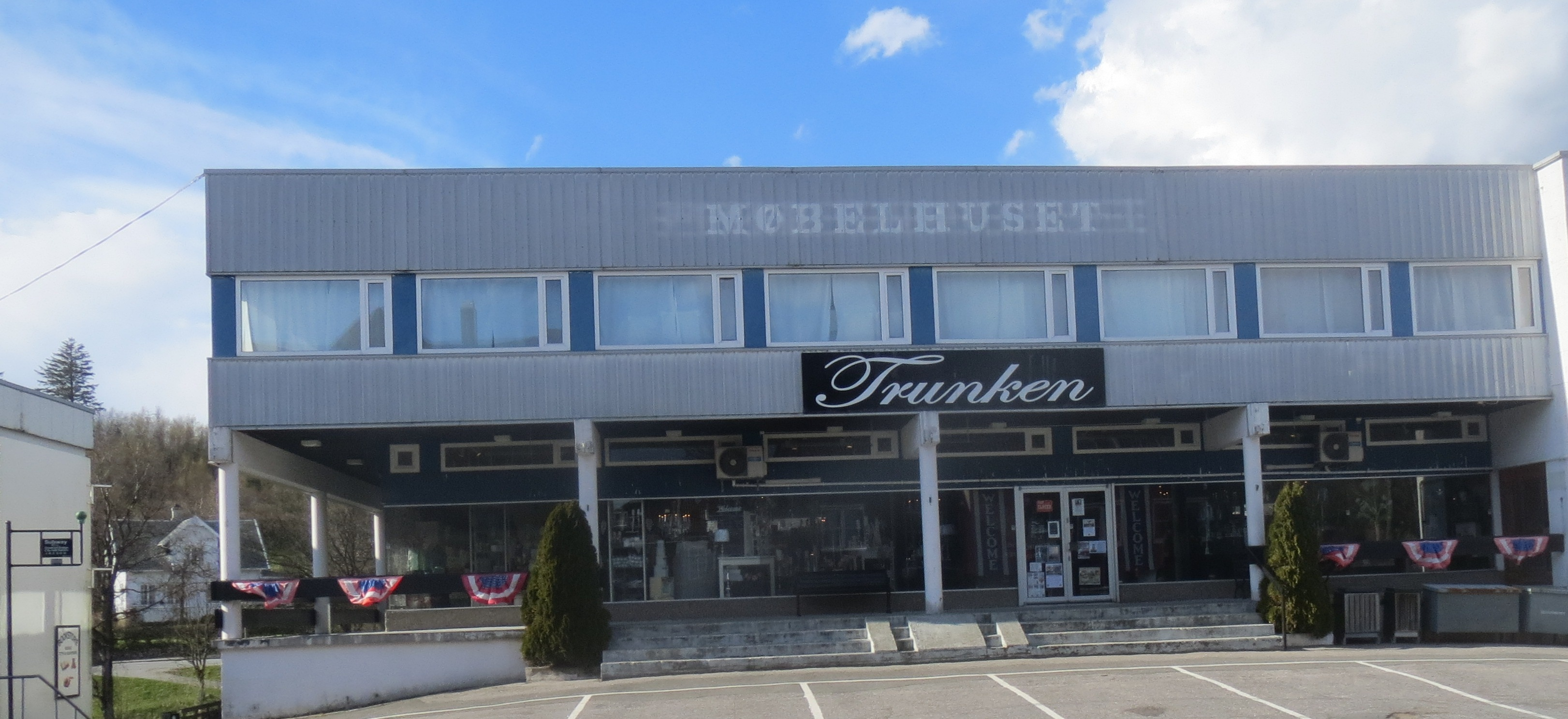
Trunken, a store in Brooklyn Square, Vanse

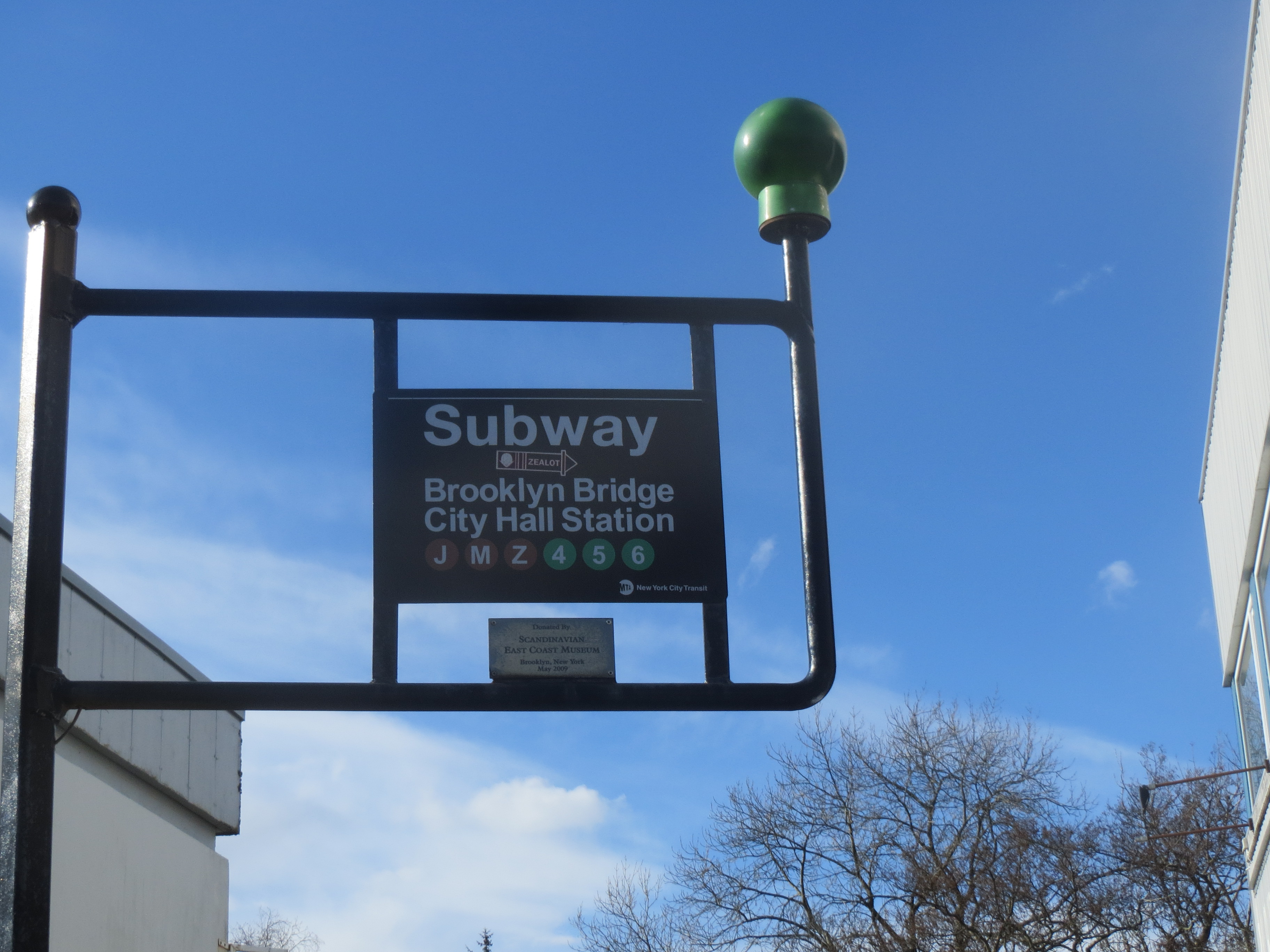
Sign at Brooklyn Square, Vanse

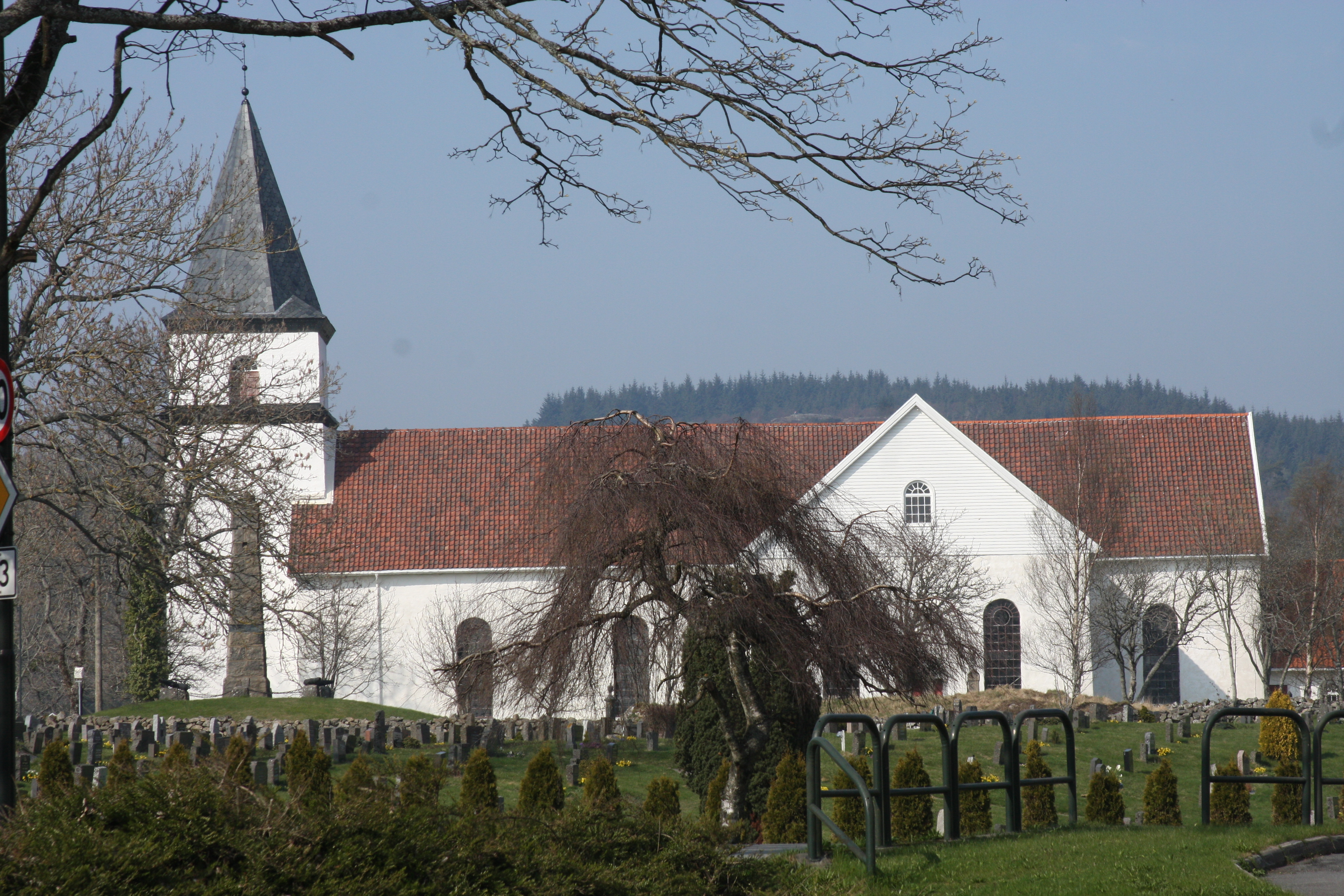
Vanse Church

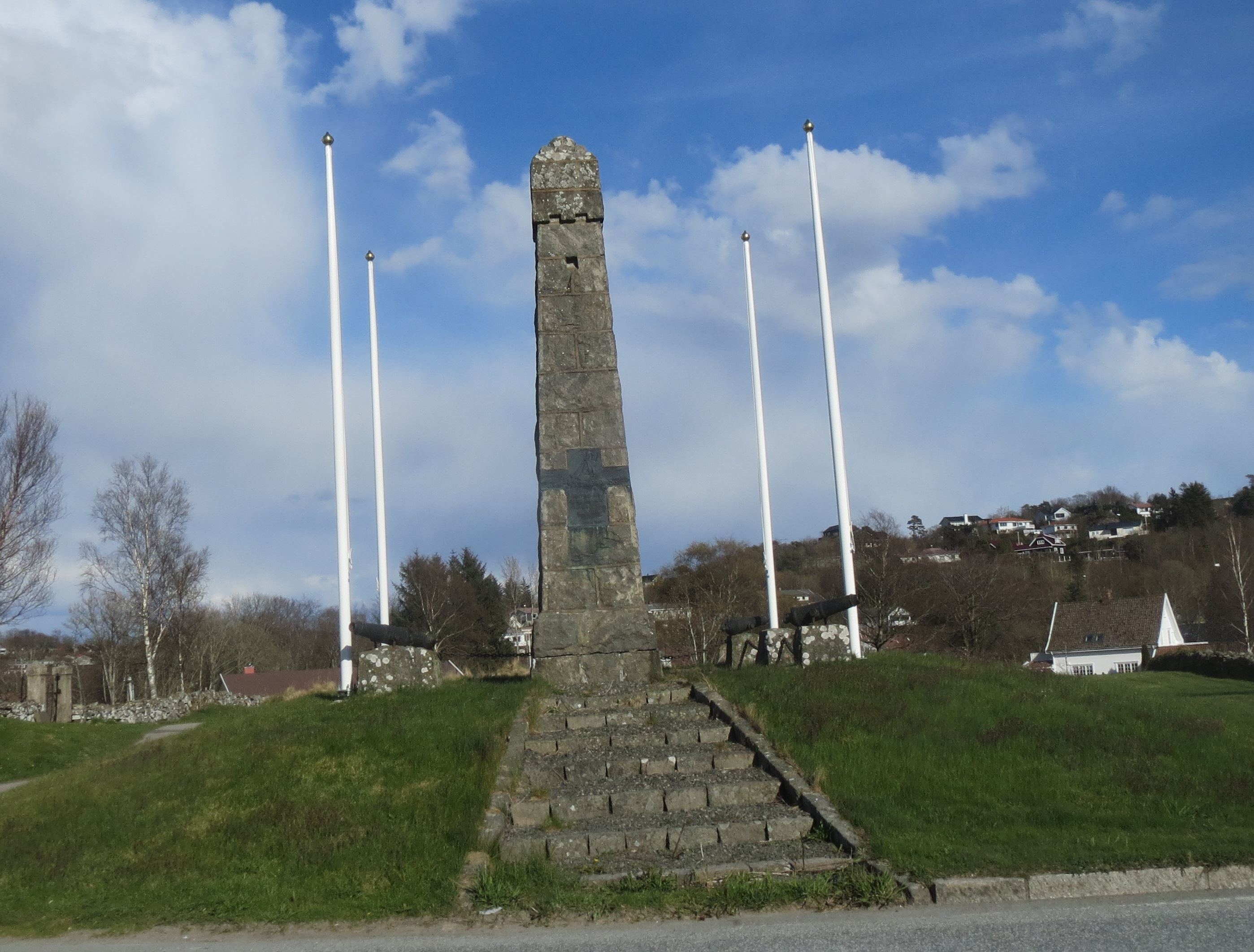
The Gunboat War Memorial

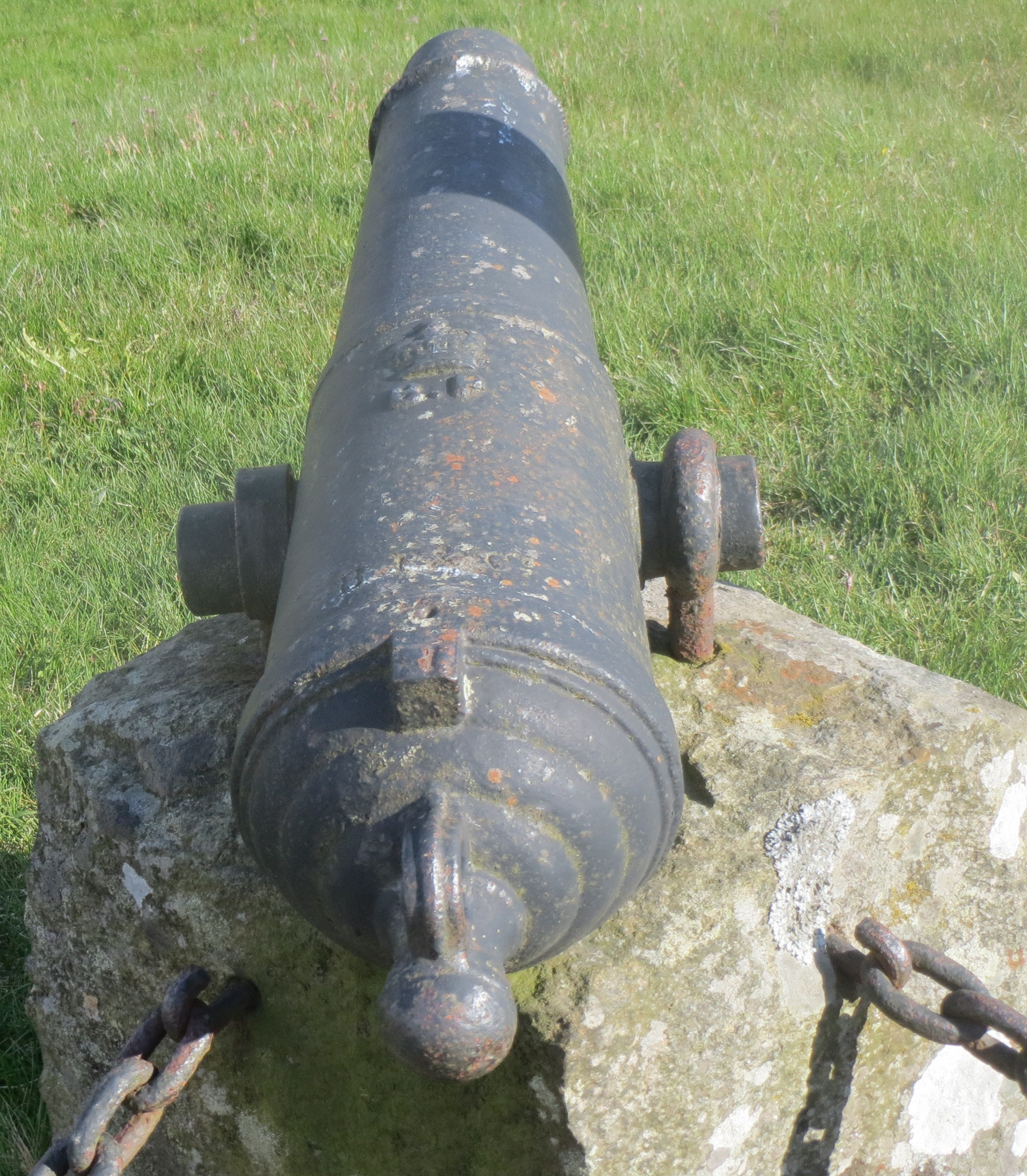
A gun (detail) at the Gunboat War Memorial

== Notable people ==
- Kjell Elvis, a professional Elvis impersonator who was raised in Vanse
- Karl Sanne, a Norwegian politician
