= Herad Municipality =

Former municipality in Vest-Agder, Norway

Herad Municipality Herad herad
- Former municipality
- Herred herred (historic name)
- Vest-Agder within Norway

- Herad within Vest-Agder
- Coordinates: 58°09′22″N 06°47′43″E
- Country: Norway
- County: Vest-Agder
- District: Lister
- Established: 1 Jan 1838
  - Created as: Formannskapsdistrikt
- Disestablished: 1 Jan 1965
  - Succeeded by: Farsund Municipality
- Administrative centre: Sande

Government
  - Mayor (1959–1964): Magnus K. Meland

Area (upon dissolution)
  - Total: 86 km^{2} (33 sq mi)
  - Rank: #433 in Norway
- Highest elevation: 487.23 m (1,598.5 ft)

Population (1964)
  - Total: 372
  - Rank: #523 in Norway
  - Density: 4.3/km^{2} (11/sq mi)
  - Change (10 years): ▼ −24.4%
- Demonym: Heradssokning

Official language
  - Norwegian form: Nynorsk
- Time zone: UTC+01:00 (CET)
  - Summer (DST): UTC+02:00 (CEST)
- ISO 3166 code: NO-1039

Herad is a former municipality in the old Vest-Agder county, Norway. The 86-square-kilometre (33 sq mi) municipality existed from 1838 until its dissolution in 1965. The area is now part of Farsund Municipality in the traditional district of Lister in Agder county. The administrative centre was the village of Sande where the Herad Church is located.

Prior to its dissolution in 1965, the 86-square-kilometre (33 sq mi) municipality was the 433rd largest by area out of the 525 municipalities in Norway. Herad Municipality was the 523rd most populous municipality in Norway with a population of about 372, making it the third smallest municipality at that time. The municipality's population density was 4.3 inhabitants per square kilometre (11/sq mi) and its population had decreased by 24.4% over the previous 10-year period.

== General information ==
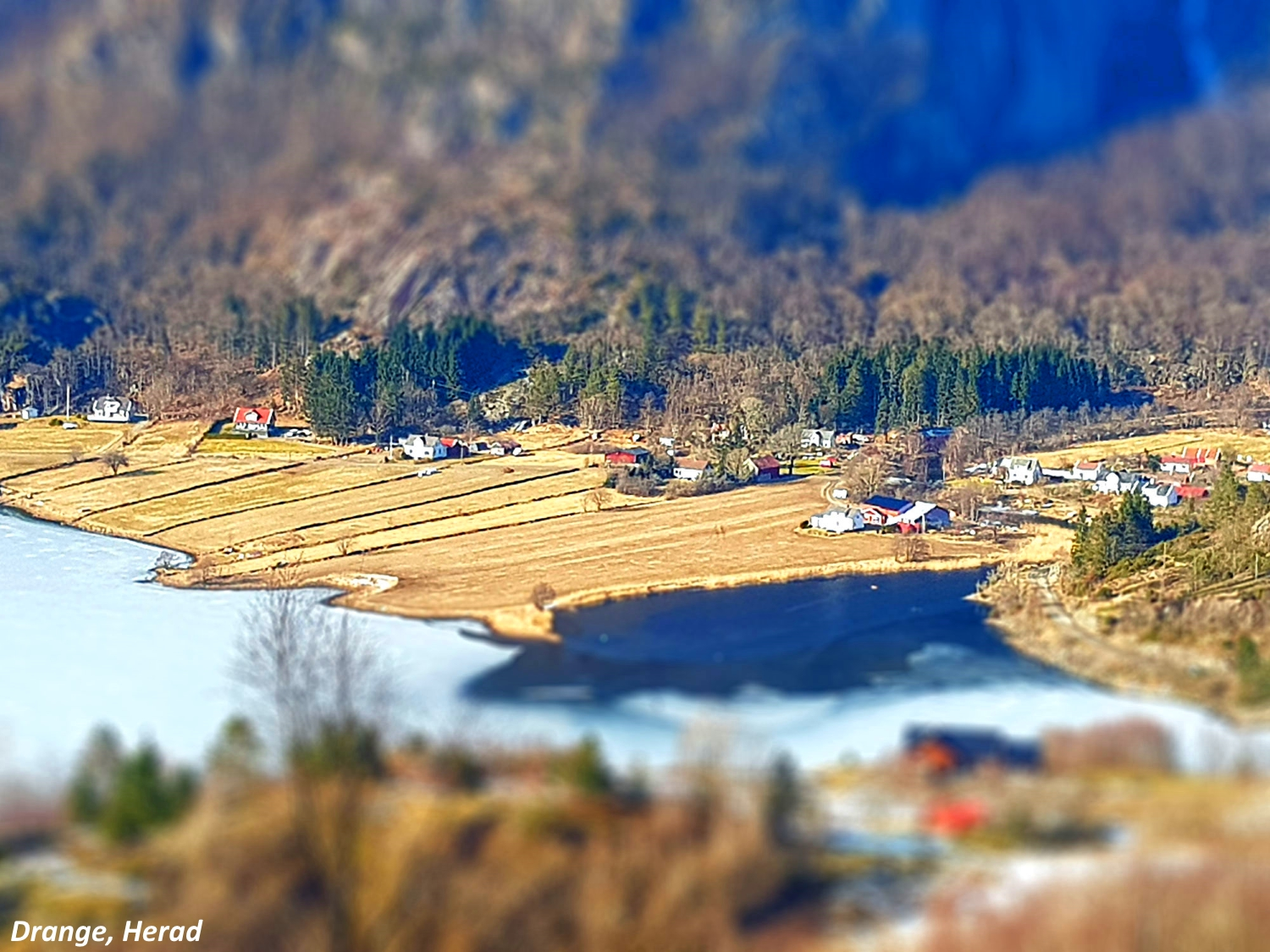
View of the Drange area in Herad

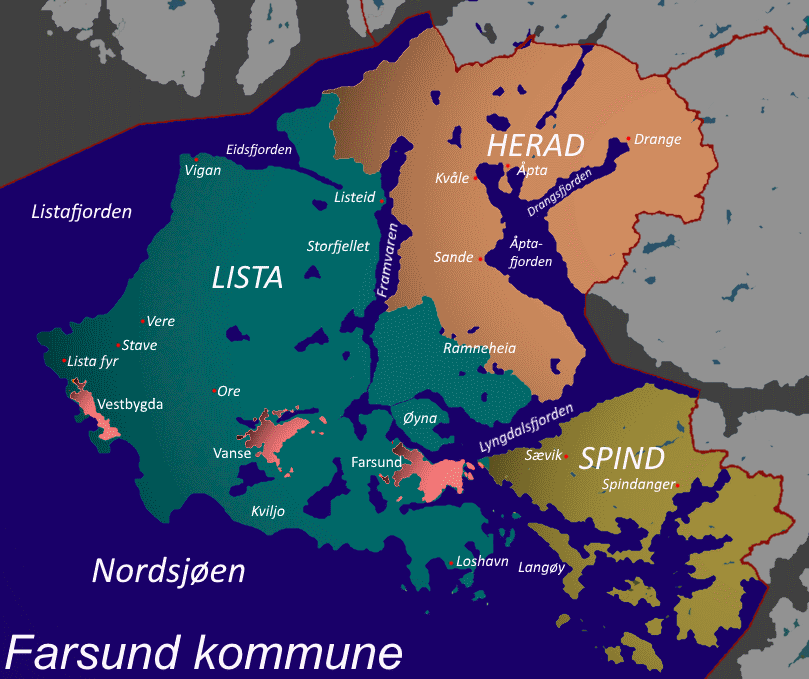
Map of the area in 1964

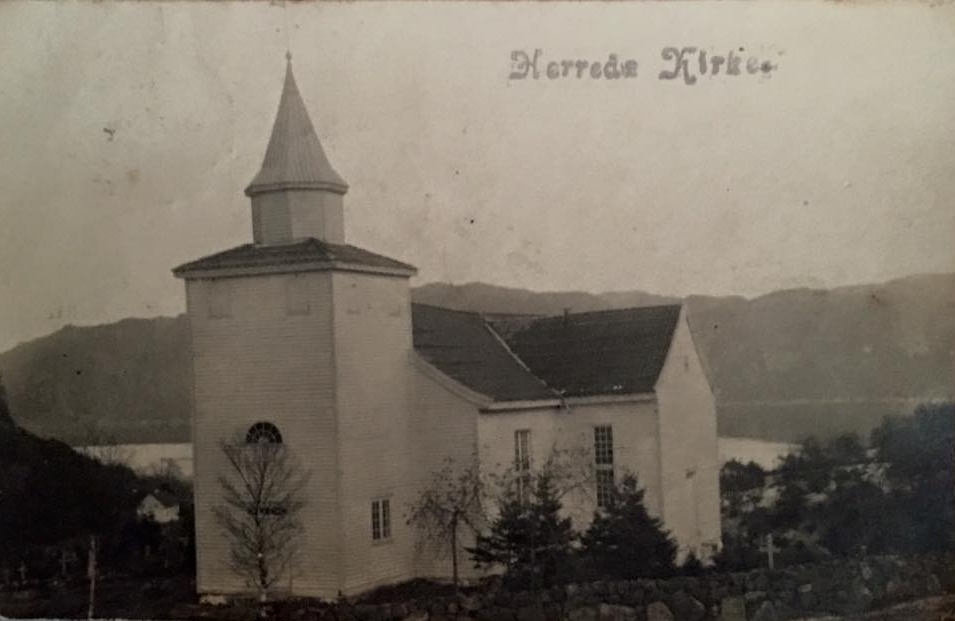
View of the old Herad Church (it burned down in 1948)

The parish of Herred (later spelled Herad) was established as a municipality on 1 January 1838 (see formannskapsdistrikt law). On 17 October 1893, Herad Municipality was divided into two: the southeastern district (population: 1,410) became the new Spind Municipality and the northwestern district (population: 1,019) remained as a smaller Herad Municipality.

During the 1960s, there were many municipal mergers across Norway due to the work of the Schei Committee. On 1 January 1965, Herad Municipality was dissolved and the following areas were merged to form an enlarged Farsund Municipality:

- the town of Farsund (population: 2,208)
- all of Herad Municipality (population: 359)
- all of Lista Municipality (population: 4,544)
- all of Spind Municipality (population: 606)

=== Name ===
The municipality (originally the parish) is named Herred (Old Norse: Herað) since the first Herad Church was built there. The name is identical to the word herað which means "village" or "hamlet". It was also a name that was used for all municipalities in Norway during the 1800s and early 1900s. Thus the name was Herred herred (lit. 'Municipality Municipality'), so it was a rather unique name.

Historically, the name of the municipality was spelled Herred. On 3 November 1917, a royal resolution changed the spelling of the name of the municipality to Herad, using the Nynorsk spelling, to give the name a more Norwegian and less Danish spelling due to Norwegian language reforms.

=== Churches ===
The Church of Norway had one parish (sokn) within Herad Municipality. At the time of the municipal dissolution, it was part of the Herad prestegjeld and the Lister prosti (deanery) in the Diocese of Agder.

Churches in Herad Municipality
Parish (sokn)	Church name	Location of the church	Year built
Herad	Herad Church	Sande	1957

== Geography ==
The municipality encompassed the area northeast of the fjord/lake Framvaren, just north of the Lista peninsula. The highest point in the municipality was the 487.23-metre (1,598.5 ft) tall mountain Kalåskniben, on the border with Lyngdal Municipality. Nes Municipality was located to the west, Feda Municipality was located to the north, Lyngdal Municipality was located to the east, Spind Municipality was located to the southeast, and Lista Municipality was located to the southwest.

== Government ==
While it existed, Herad Municipality was responsible for primary education (through 10th grade), outpatient health services, senior citizen services, welfare and other social services, zoning, economic development, and municipal roads and utilities. The municipality was governed by a municipal council of directly elected representatives. The mayor was indirectly elected by a vote of the municipal council. The municipality was under the jurisdiction of the Lyngdal District Court and the Agder Court of Appeal.

=== Municipal council ===
The municipal council (Heradsstyre) of Herad Municipality was made up of 13 representatives that were elected to four year terms. The tables below show the historical composition of the council by political party.

Herad heradsstyre 1963–1964
Party name (in Nynorsk)	Number of representatives
Local List(s) (Lokale lister)	13
Total number of members:	13
Note: On 1 January 1965, Herad Municipality became part of Farsund Municipality.

Herad heradsstyre 1959–1963
Party name (in Nynorsk)	Number of representatives
Local List(s) (Lokale lister)	13
Total number of members:	13

Herad heradsstyre 1955–1959
Party name (in Nynorsk)	Number of representatives
Local List(s) (Lokale lister)	13
Total number of members:	13

Herad heradsstyre 1951–1955
Party name (in Nynorsk)	Number of representatives
Local List(s) (Lokale lister)	12
Total number of members:	12

Herad heradsstyre 1947–1951
Party name (in Nynorsk)	Number of representatives
Labour Party (Arbeidarpartiet)	1
Joint List(s) of Non-Socialist Parties (Borgarlege Felleslister)	7
Local List(s) (Lokale lister)	4
Total number of members:	12

Herad heradsstyre 1945–1947
Party name (in Nynorsk)	Number of representatives
Labour Party (Arbeidarpartiet)	2
Local List(s) (Lokale lister)	10
Total number of members:	12

Herad heradsstyre 1937–1941*
Party name (in Nynorsk)	Number of representatives
Labour Party (Arbeidarpartiet)	3
Joint List(s) of Non-Socialist Parties (Borgarlege Felleslister)	6
Local List(s) (Lokale lister)	3
Total number of members:	12
Note: Due to the German occupation of Norway during World War II, no elections were held for new municipal councils until after the war ended in 1945.

=== Mayors ===
The mayor (Nynorsk: ordførar) of Herad Municipality was the political leader of the municipality and the chairperson of the municipal council. The following people have held this position:

- 1838–1841: Jeremias Fredrik Hansen Friis
- 1842–1843: Rasmus Tobias Rasmussen Ekeland
- 1843–1855: Ulric Bugge
- 1855–1857: Peder Christian Nøtland
- 1858–1861: Enok Lundegaard
- 1862–1863: Peder Antonisen Sæveland
- 1864–1865: Gabriel Torkildsen Grimestad
- 1866–1867: Tobias Olsen Rødland
- 1868–1871: Peder Antonisen Sæveland
- 1872–1873: Gabriel Torkildsen Grimestad
- 1874–1877: Peter Rasmussen Bugdøy
- 1878–1879: Jens Andreas Torsen Welle
- 1880–1881: Ingvard Andreassen
- 1882–1883: Peder Rasmussen
- 1884–1889: Hans M. Ariansen
- 1890–1891: Hans Jansen
- 1892–1893: Gabriel J. Jensen
- 1894–1897: Kristian Tønnesen
- 1897–1897: Andreas A. Tosås
- 1897–1898: Daniel Kristoffersen Åpta
- 1899–1901: Georg Grimestad
- 1902–1904: Daniel Kristoffersen Åpta
- 1904–1905: Kristian Tønnesen
- 1905–1907: Hans Johansen Klungland
- 1908–1913: Sven S. Haaland
- 1914–1916: Werner H. Sande
- 1917–1922: Georg Grimestad
- 1923–1925: Syvert Kjørkleiv
- 1926–1935: Martin A. Sandvik
- 1935–1937: Johannes Aadnesen Drange
- 1937–1940: Syvert Kjørkleiv
- 1941–1941: Ole Tønnesen Skjoldal
- 1945–1955: Magnus Meland
- 1955–1958: Robert Holmen
- 1958–1959: Randulf Lauland
- 1959–1964: Magnus K. Meland

== See also ==
- List of former municipalities of Norway
