= Vanse Church =

Church in Agder, Norway

- Vanse kirke
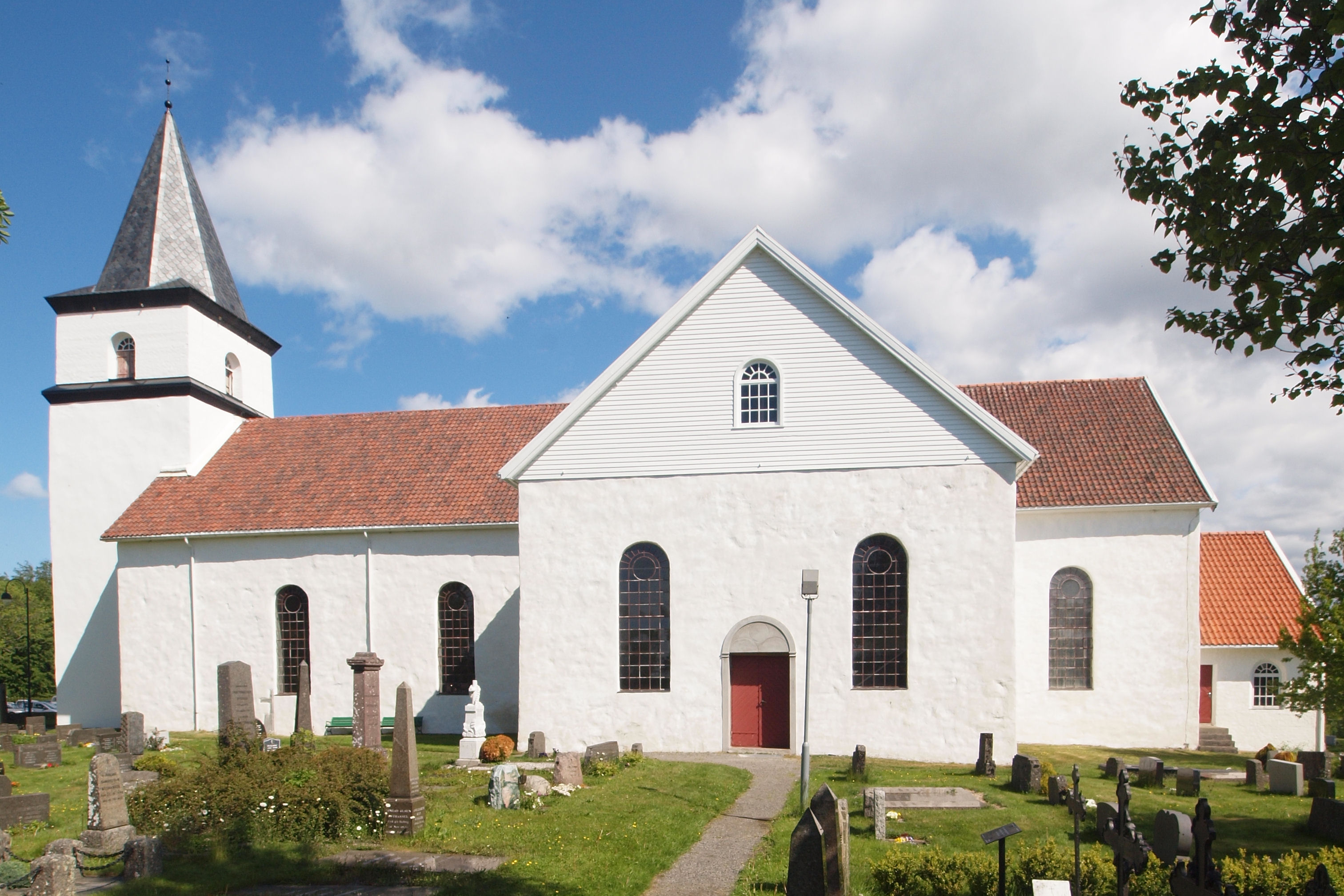
- View of the church
- Vanse Church
- 58.1006°N 06.6936°E
- Location: Farsund Municipality, Agder
- Country: Norway
- Denomination: Church of Norway
- Previous denomination: Catholic Church
- Churchmanship: Evangelical Lutheran
- Website: listamenighet.no

History
- Former name: Lista kirke
- Status: Parish church
- Events: Rebuilt in 13th century Rebuilt in 1849

Architecture
- Functional status: Active
- Architectural type: Cruciform
- Completed: 1037; 989 years ago

Specifications
- Capacity: 850
- Materials: Stone

Administration
- Diocese: Agder og Telemark
- Deanery: Lister og Mandal prosti
- Parish: Lista
- Norwegian Cultural Heritage Site
- Type: Church
- Status: Automatically protected
- ID: 85763

Vanse Church (Norwegian: Vanse kirke; historic: Lista kirke) is a parish church of the Church of Norway in Farsund Municipality in Agder county, Norway. It is located in the village of Vanse. It is the main church for the Lista parish which is part of the Lister og Mandal prosti (deanery) in the Diocese of Agder og Telemark. The white, stone church was built in a cruciform design around the year 1037 using plans drawn up by an unknown architect. The medieval church was rebuilt and expanded in the 12th century and then again in the mid-19th century. The church currently seats about 850 people.

== History ==
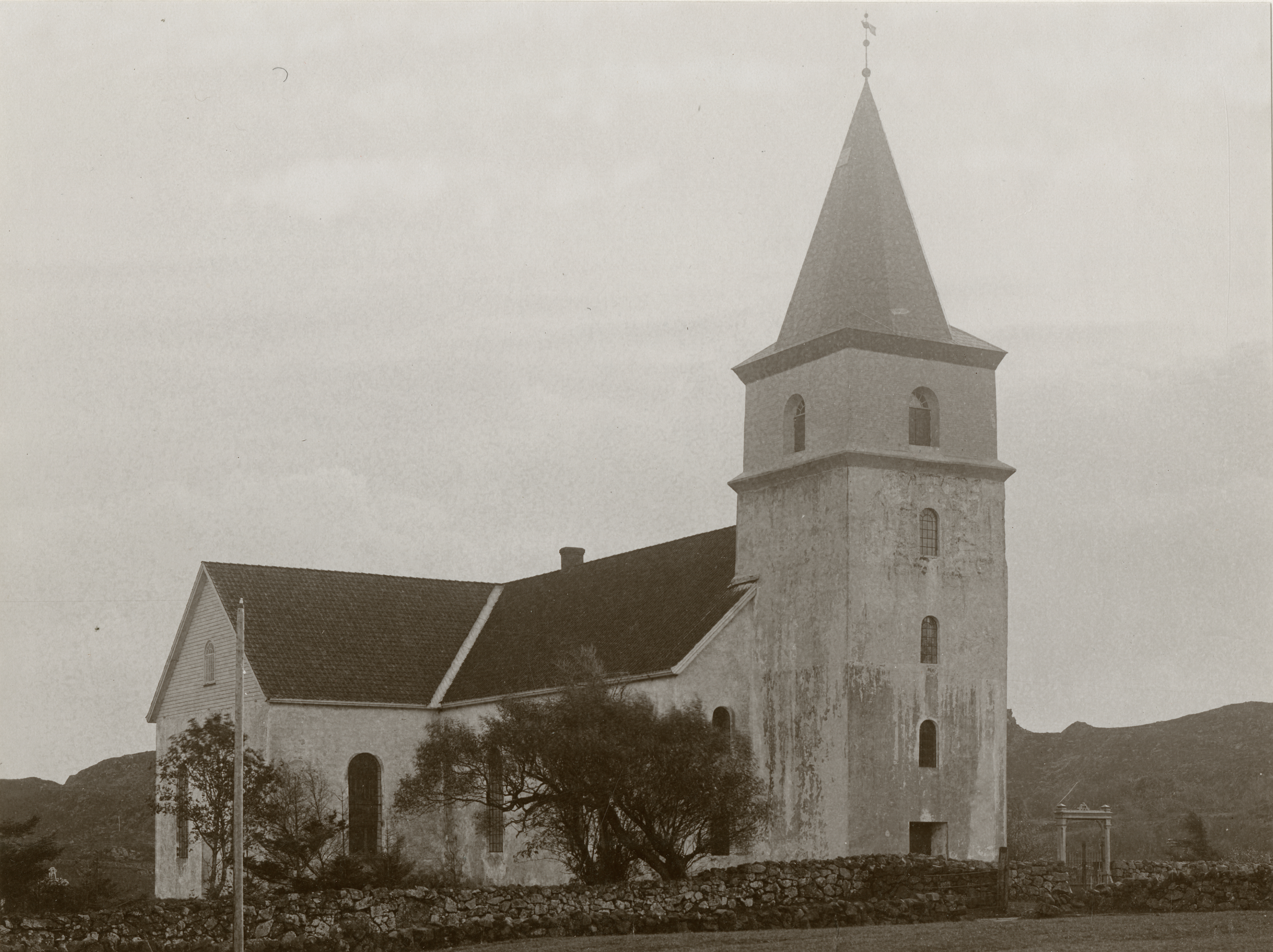
View of the church (c. 1900)

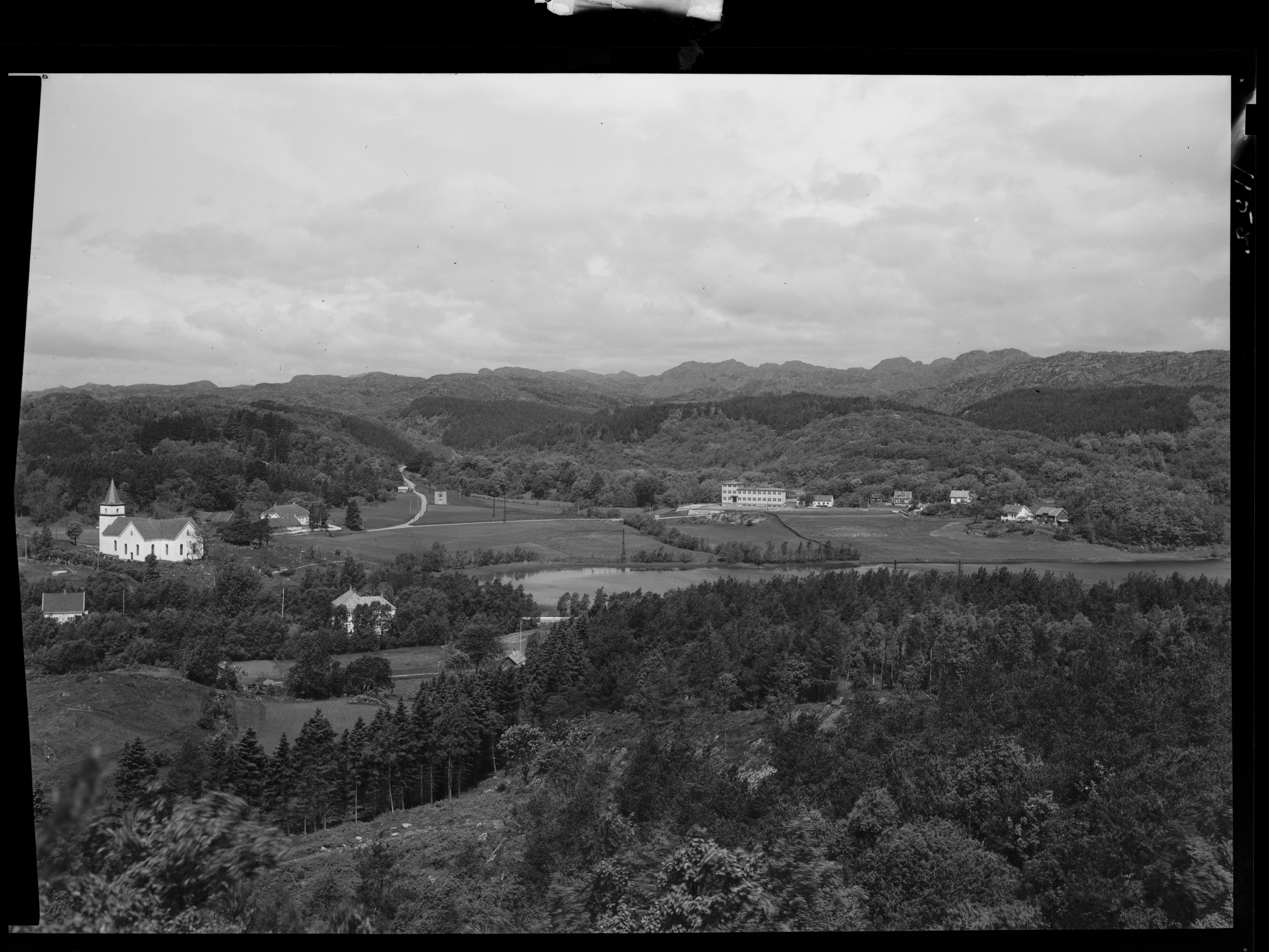
View of the church area (c. 1950)

Given that Lista apparently was a more populous area than the Oddernes parish, and that these churches seem to be built by the same teams, Vanse Church has been dated to around the year 1037. The first church may have been built in wood and then replaced by a stone church at a later stage.

The stone church may originally have been in the Romanesque style. The church still has pointed arches in early Gothic style. The western part of the nave is the oldest remaining part of the church. Originally, the church had two windows high up on the south wall, and two windows at the choir wall. Other literature indicates that the creation of the church was begun around 1200, and designed with pointed arches in early Gothic architecture. However, this may indicate the dating of some of the oldest parts of the church are derived from the 13th century.

In 1814, this church served as an election church (Norwegian: valgkirke). Together with more than 300 other parish churches across Norway, it was a polling station for elections to the 1814 Norwegian Constituent Assembly which wrote the Constitution of Norway. This was Norway's first national elections. Each church parish was a constituency that elected people called "electors" who later met together in each county to elect the representatives for the assembly that was to meet at Eidsvoll Manor later that year.

The church was rebuilt again and expanded in 1848, because of an accident in the church where eight people were killed and several were injured. The accident occurred when there arose panic in the crowded church and several people were trampled to death.

The choir and the east wall were demolished in 1848 and they were replaced by a large cross-shaped extension. It was during the restoration that a small box of lead with a piece of cloth was found. They also found some limestone and a piece of bone from an unknown saint (possibly St. Olaf). It was found under the church floor in Vanse Church, just in front of the former altar.

In 1872, the church was struck by lightning and the subsequent fire in the building caused some damage to the roof which had to be rebuilt.

The church has also subsequently undergone some restoration work. The church is listed as a protected site by the Norwegian Directorate for Cultural Heritage, pursuant to Norwegian law.

== Media gallery ==
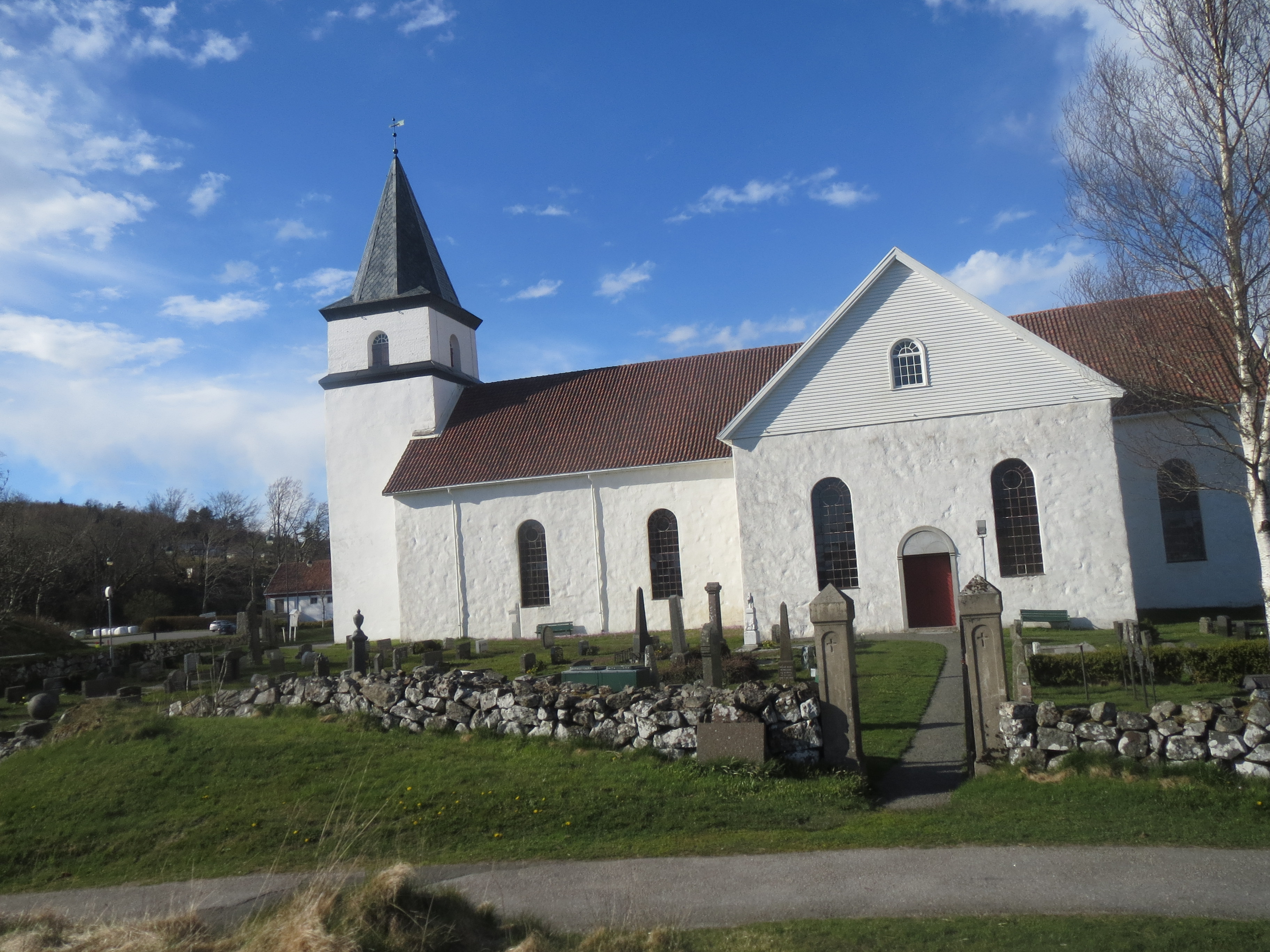

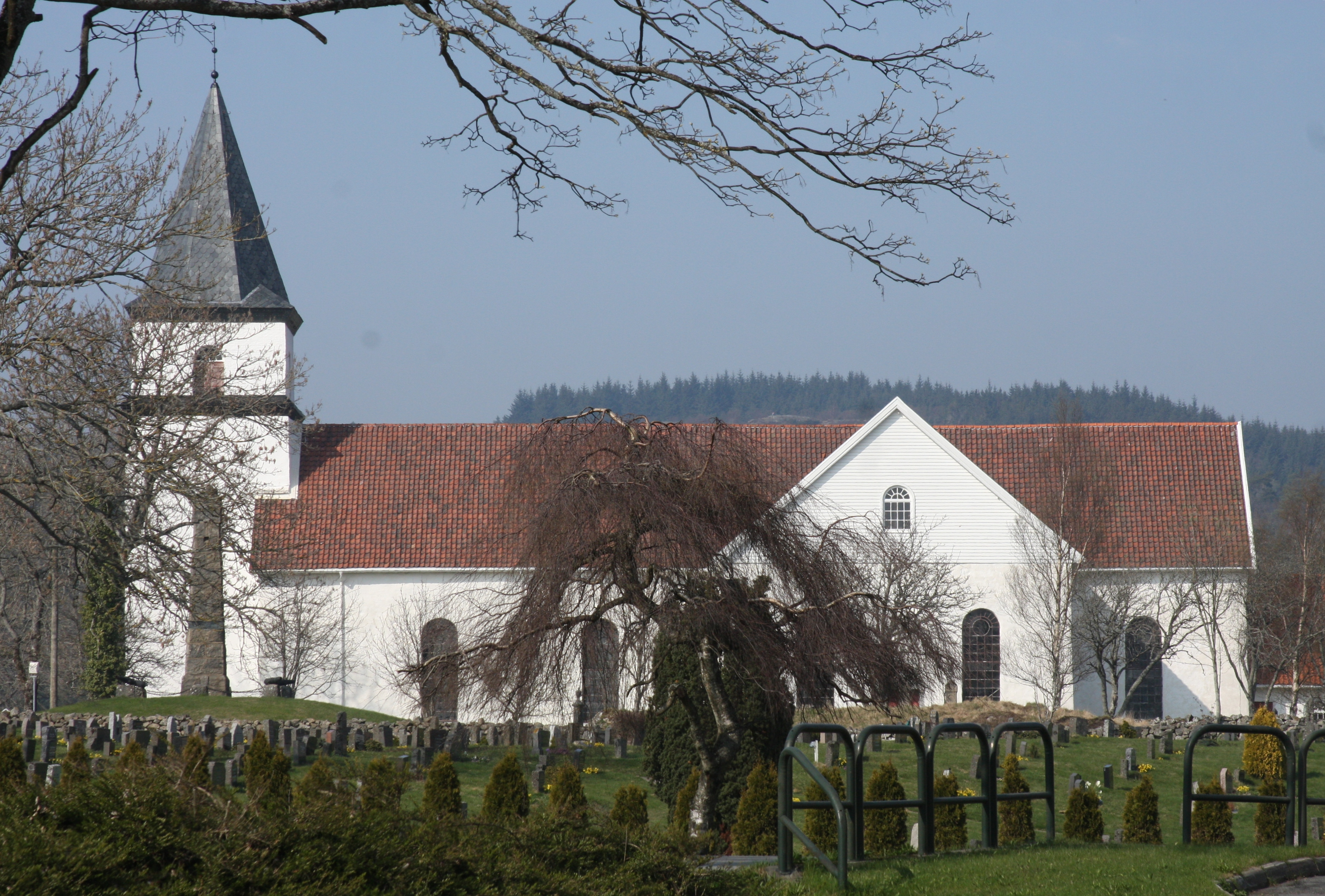

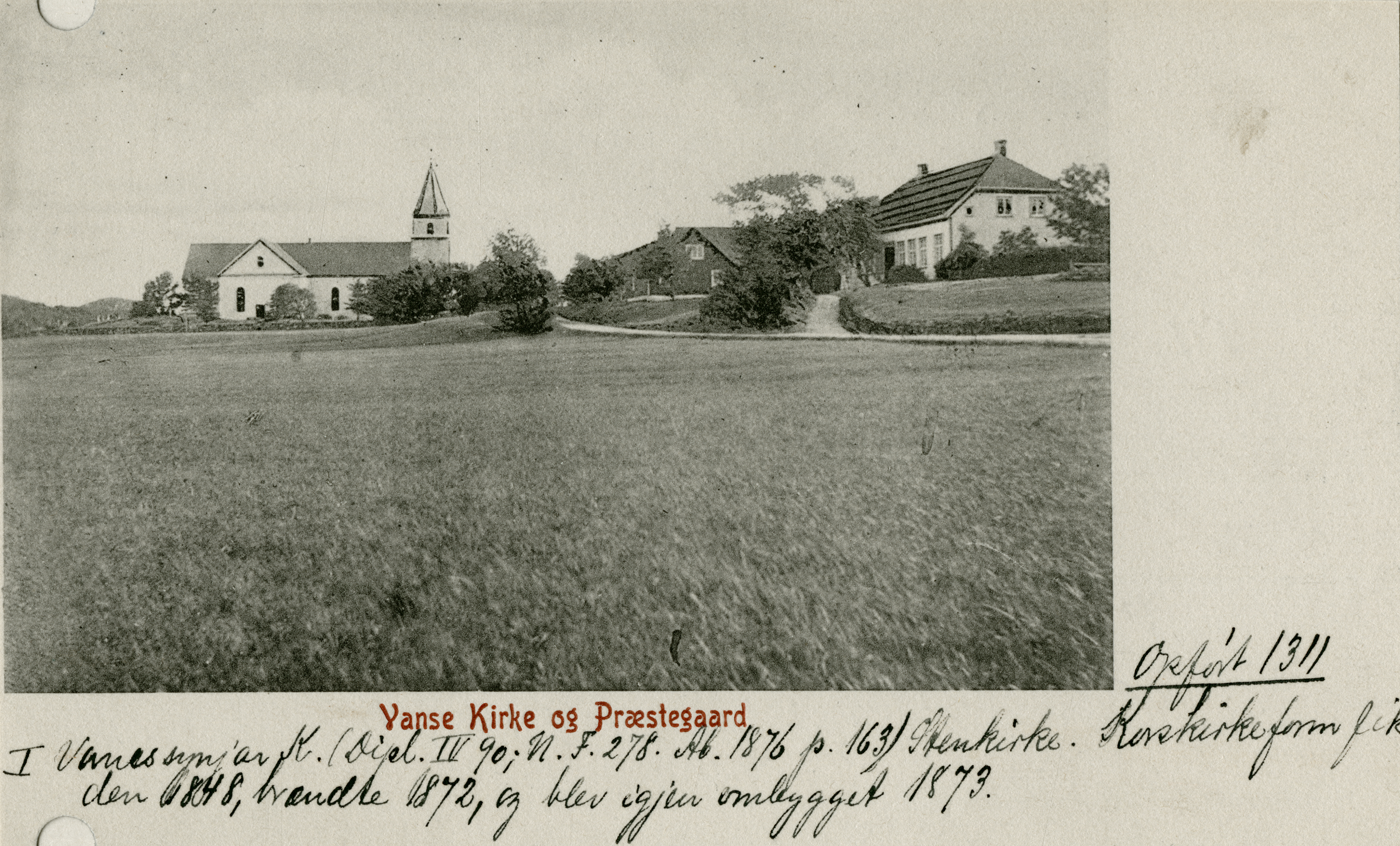

== See also ==
- List of churches in Agder og Telemark
