= Farsund (town) =

Town in Agder, Norway

- Town/City
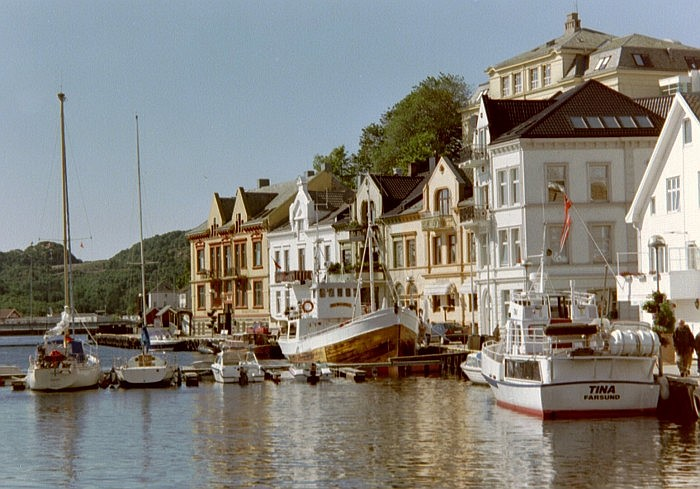
- View of the town
- Interactive map of Farsund
- Coordinates: 58.09479°N 6.80466°E
- Country: Norway
- Region: Southern Norway
- County: Agder
- District: Lister
- Municipality: Farsund Municipality
- Established as
- Ladested: 1795

Area
  - Total: 3.18 km^{2} (1.23 sq mi)
- Elevation: 2 m (6.6 ft)

Population (2026)
  - Total: 3,531
  - Density: 1,110/km^{2} (2,900/sq mi)
- Demonyms: Farsunder; Farsundar
- Time zone: UTC+01:00 (CET)
  - Summer (DST): UTC+02:00 (CEST)
- Post Code: 4550 Farsund

Farsund is a town within Farsund Municipality in Agder county, Norway. The town also the administrative centre of the municipality. It is located near the mouth of the Lyngdalsfjorden, about 5 kilometres (3.1 mi) east of the village of Vanse. Frelserens Church is the main church for the town. The 3.18-square-kilometre (790-acre) town has a population (2026) of 3,531 and a population density of 1,110 inhabitants per square kilometre (2,900/sq mi).

== History ==
The village of Farsund grew up around a protected harbour on the Lyngdalsfjorden. It was a sheltered place for merchant ships to dock as opposed to the nearby ports at Lista or Lindesnes which were exposed to the open ocean. The merchant, Jochum Brinch Lund is often referred to as the founder of the town since he was instrumental in the village receiving ladested status in 1795, giving it special trading rights. Since then, Farsund became a very busy commercial and shipping port.

On 1 January 1838, the town of Farsund was established as a municipality of its own under the new formannskapsdistrikt law. The small town existed on its own for many years. On 1 January 1903, a small area in the neighboring Vanse Municipality (population: 99), located just outside the town of Farsund, was transferred into the town. Again, in 1948 another small area from the neighboring Lista Municipality (population: 64) was transferred into the town of Farsund.

During the 1960s, there were many municipal mergers across Norway due to the work of the Schei Committee. On 1 January 1965, a major municipal merger took place by merging the following areas into a new, much larger Farsund Municipality:

- the town of Farsund (population: 2,208)
- all of Herad Municipality (population: 359)
- all of Lista Municipality (population: 4,544)
- all of Spind Municipality (population: 606)

== Government ==
In Norway, all local government rests with the municipalities, so the urban "town" of Farsund falls under the municipal council of Farsund Municipality.

== Media gallery ==
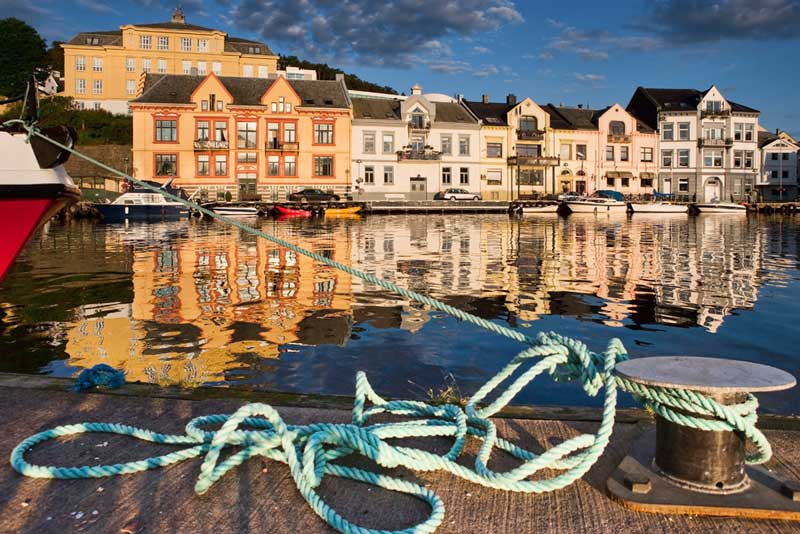
View of the harbour

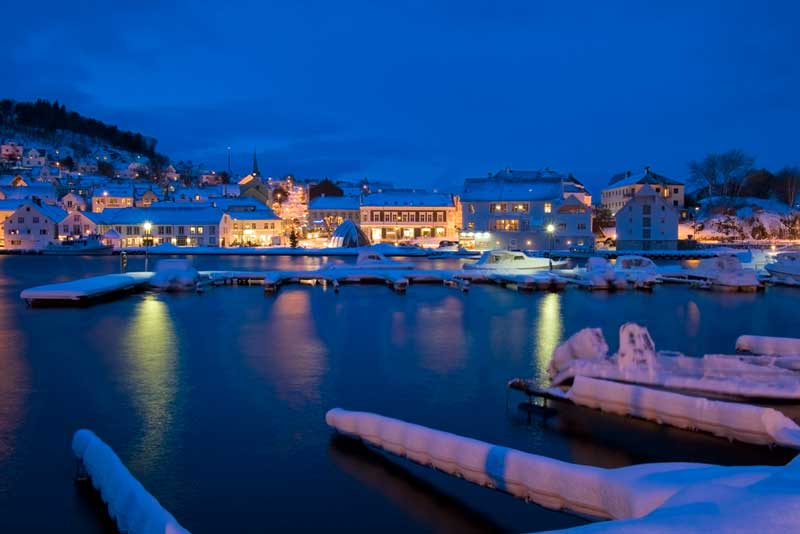
Farsund in the winter

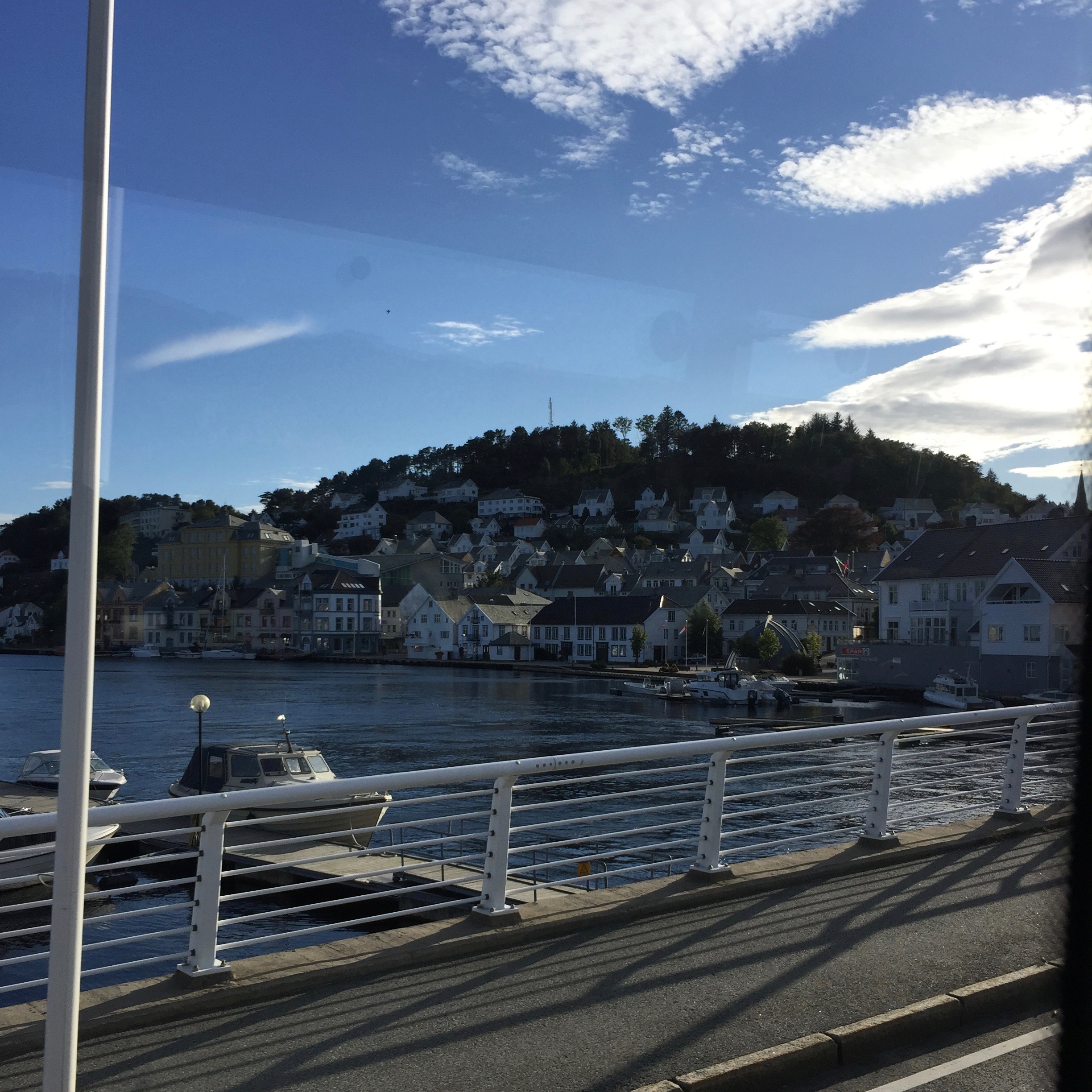
Houses overlooking the fjord

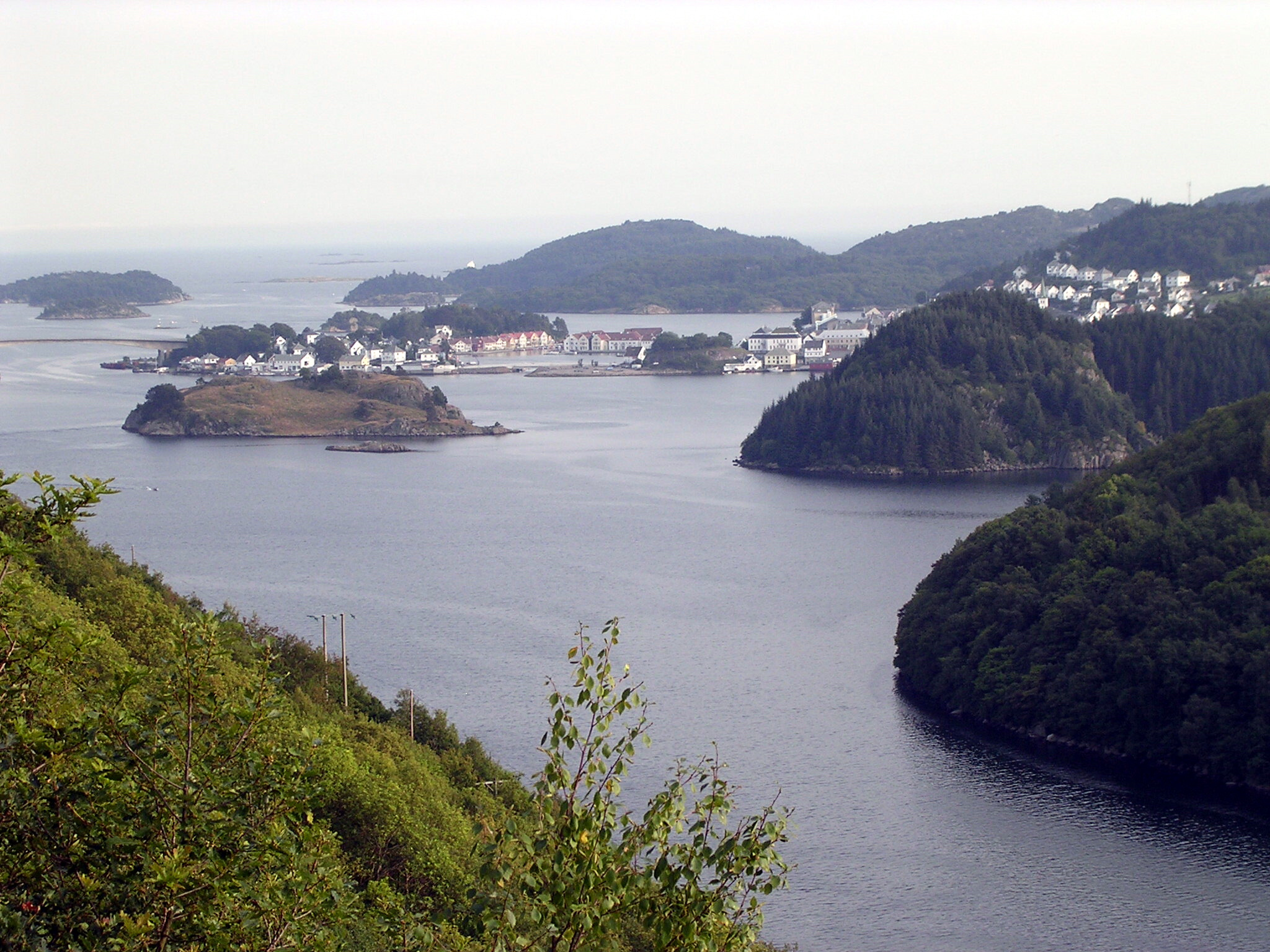
View of the islands in the harbour

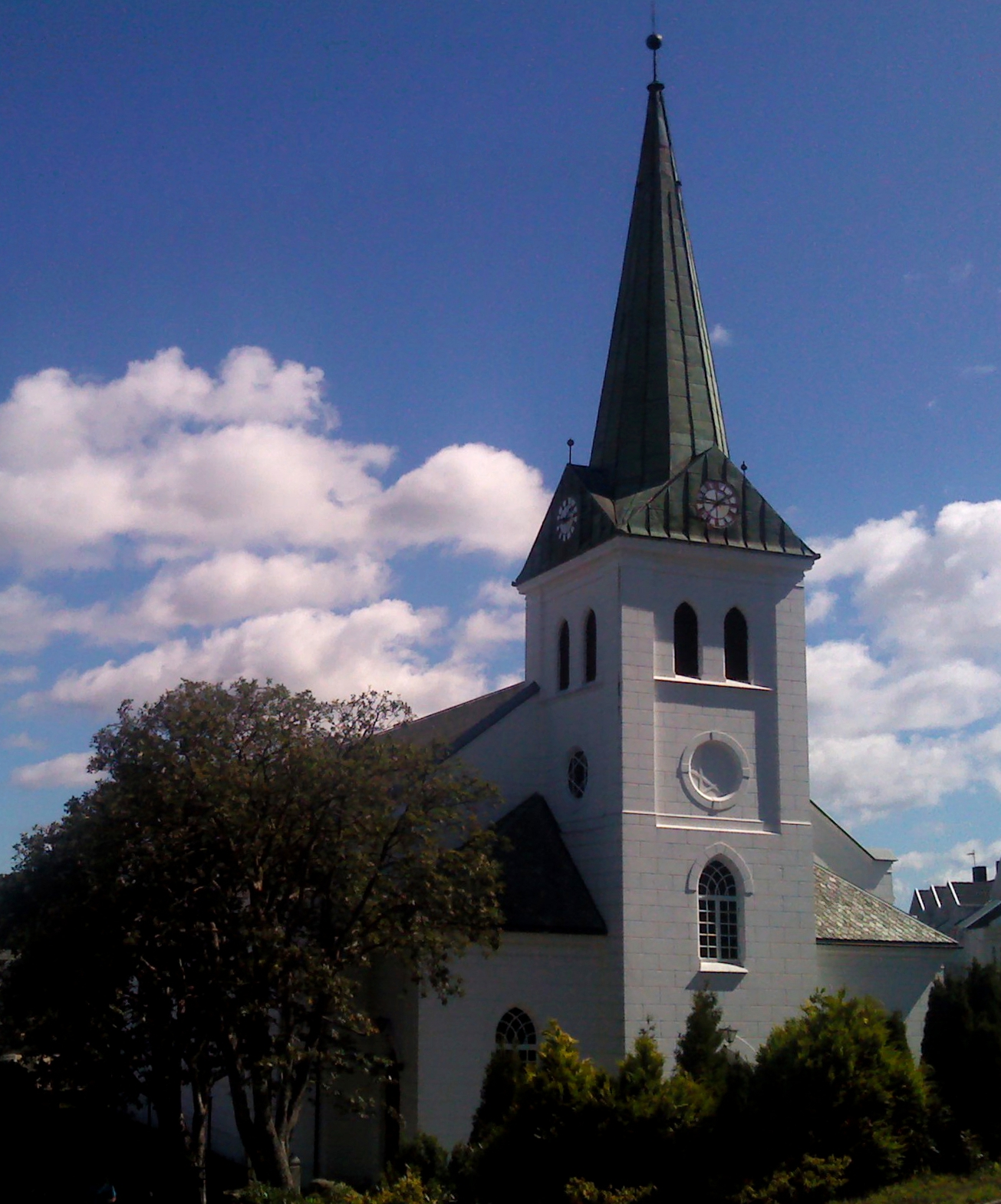
Frelserens Church in Farsund

== See also ==
- List of towns and cities in Norway
