= Vestbygda Chapel =

Church in Agder, Norway

- Vestbygda kapell
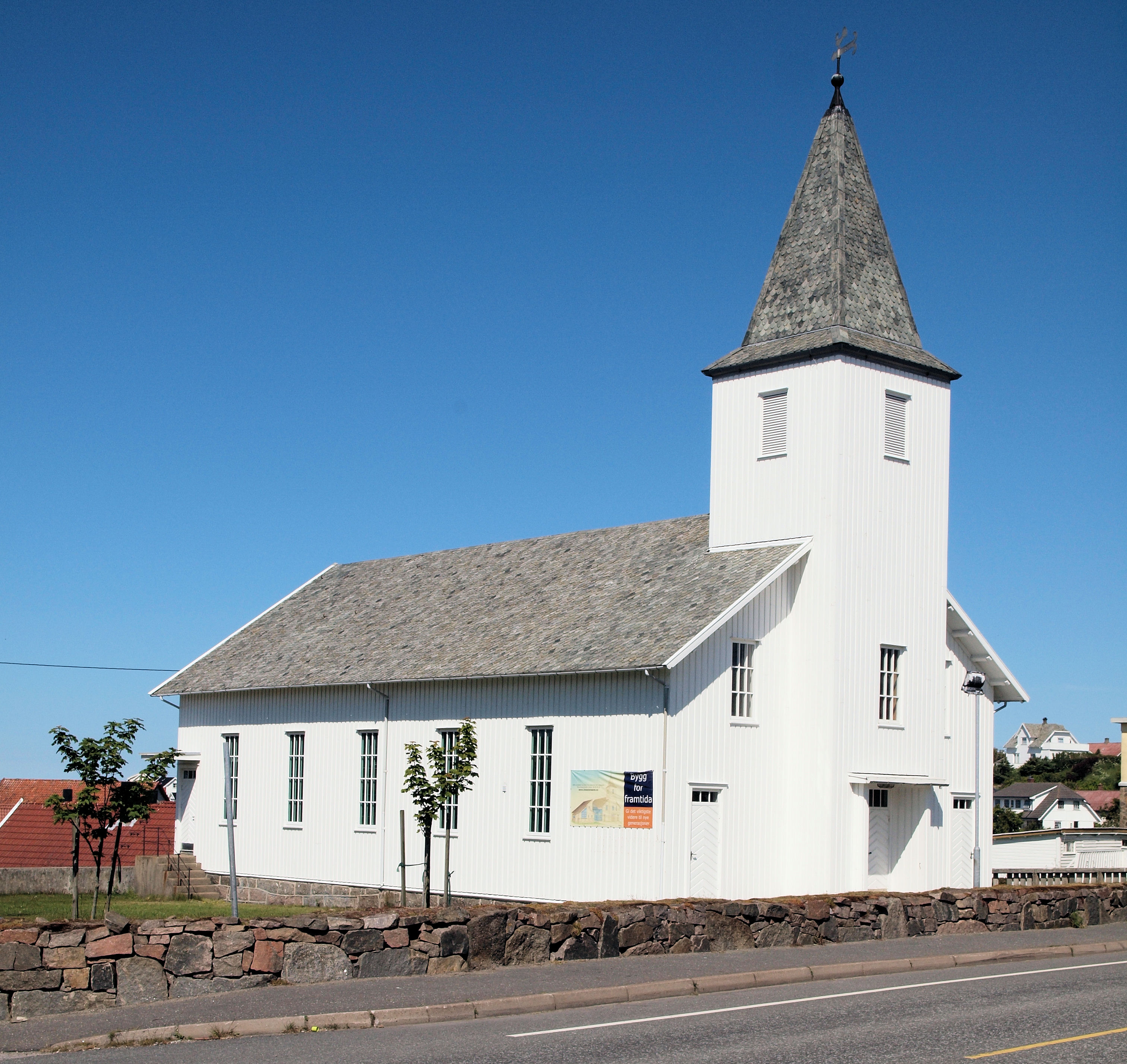
- View of the church
- Vestbygda Chapel
- 58.10034°N 06.58617°E
- Location: Farsund Municipality, Agder
- Country: Norway
- Denomination: Church of Norway
- Churchmanship: Evangelical Lutheran

History
- Status: Parish church
- Founded: 1909; 117 years ago
- Consecrated: 1909; 117 years ago

Architecture
- Functional status: Active
- Architect: D.J. Meberg
- Architectural type: Long church
- Completed: 1909; 117 years ago

Specifications
- Capacity: 320
- Materials: Wood

Administration
- Diocese: Agder og Telemark
- Deanery: Lister og Mandal prosti
- Parish: Lista
- Norwegian Cultural Heritage Site
- Type: Church
- Status: Not protected
- ID: 85811

Vestbygda Chapel (Norwegian: Vestbygda kapell) is a parish church of the Church of Norway in Farsund Municipality in Agder county, Norway. It is located in the village of Vestbygd. It is one of the two churches for the Lista parish which is part of the Lister og Mandal prosti (deanery) in the Diocese of Agder og Telemark. The white, wooden church was built in a long church design in 1909 using plans drawn up by the architect D.J. Meberg. The church seats about 320 people.

== Media gallery ==
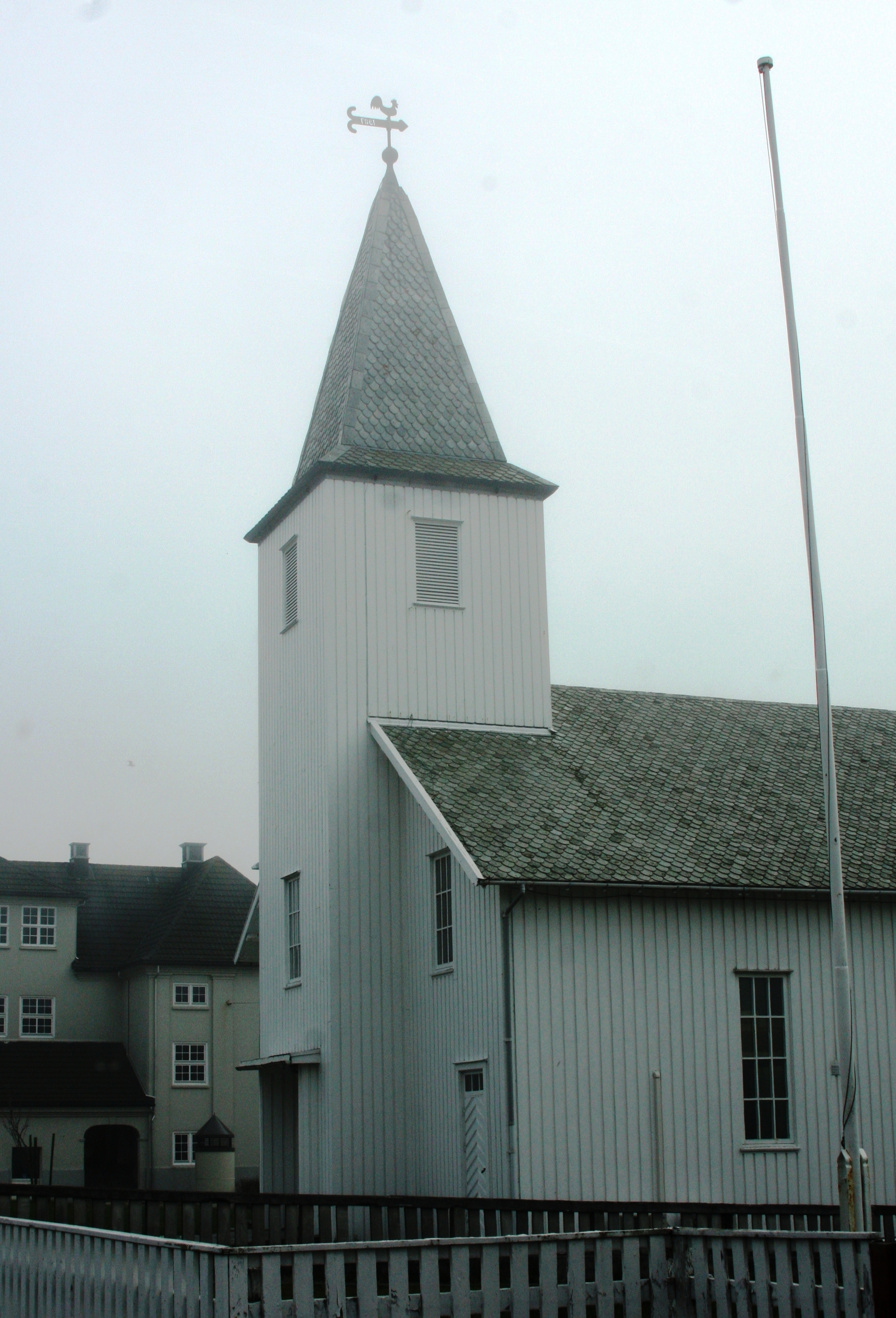

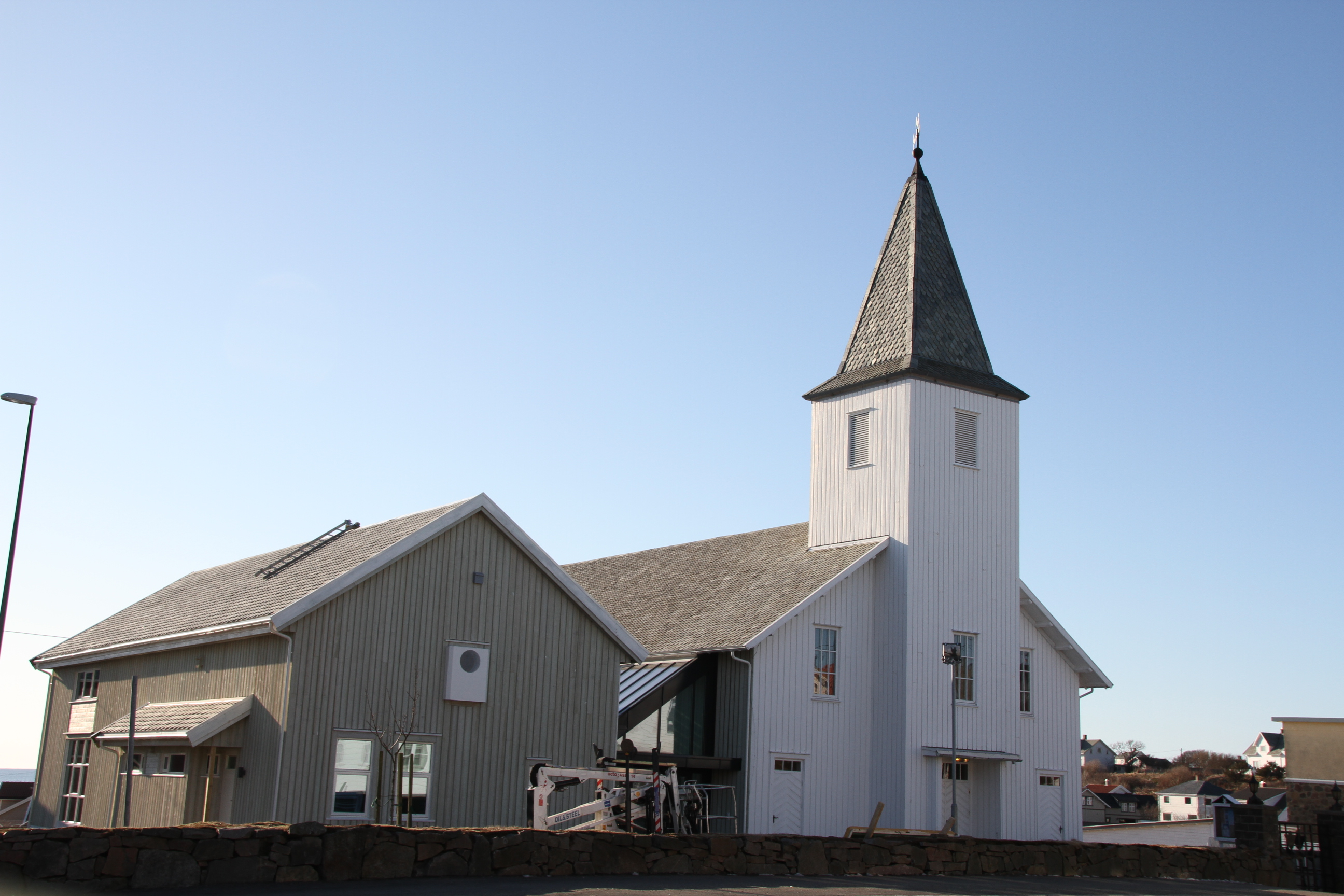

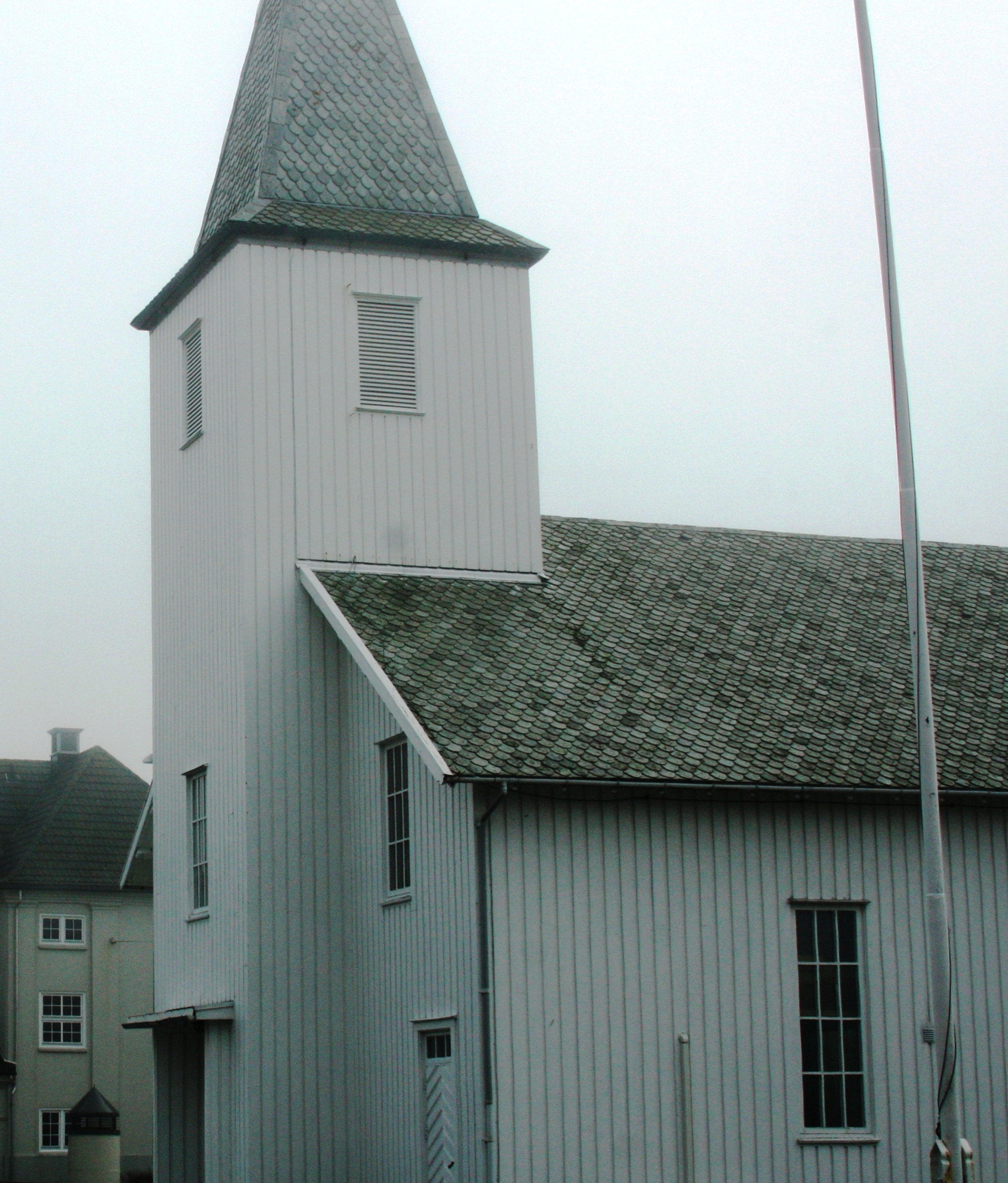

== See also ==
- List of churches in Agder og Telemark
