= Herad Church (Agder) =

Church in Agder, Norway

- Herad kirke
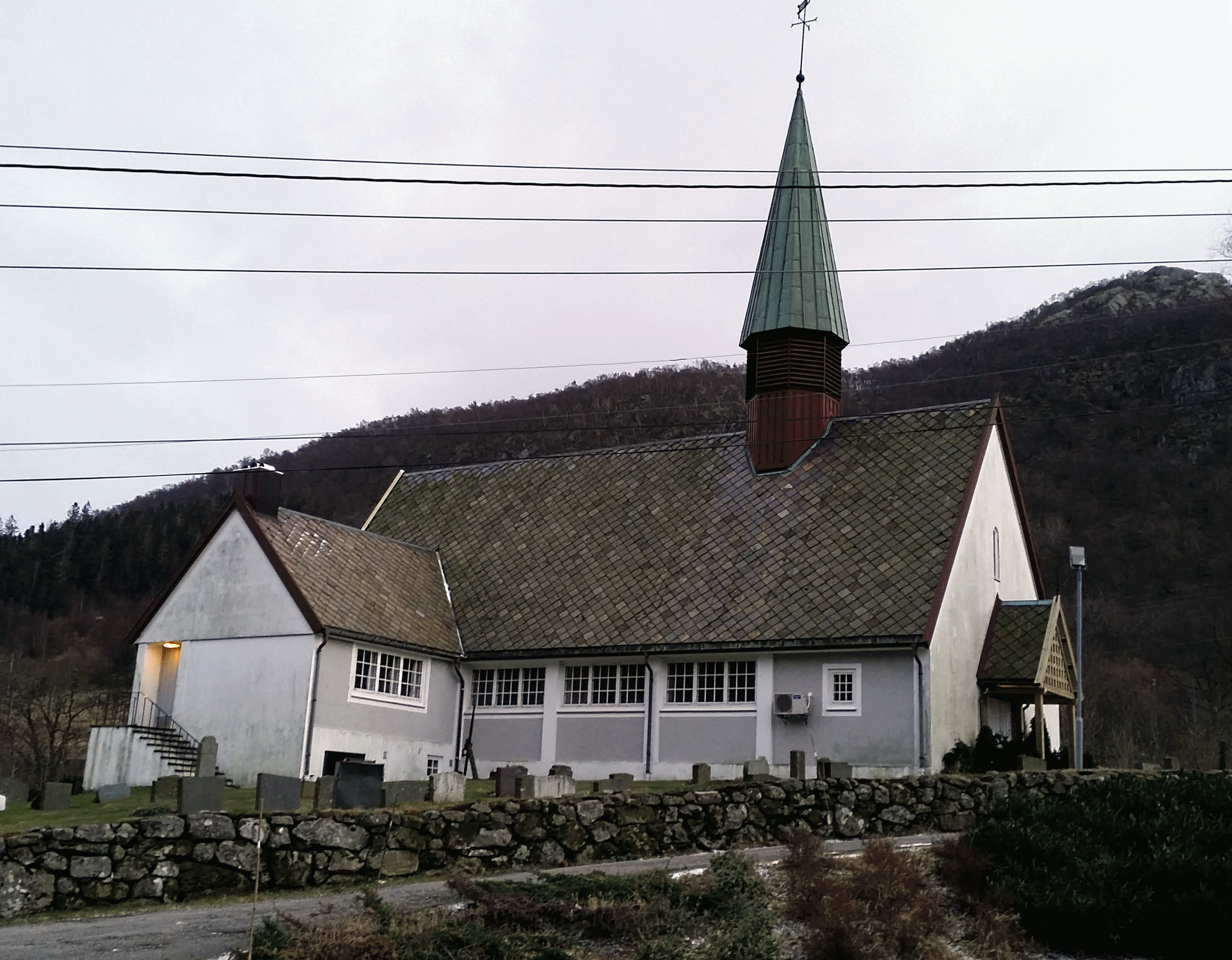
- View of the church
- Herad Church
- 58.1562°N 06.7954°E
- Location: Farsund Municipality, Agder
- Country: Norway
- Denomination: Church of Norway
- Churchmanship: Evangelical Lutheran

History
- Status: Parish church
- Founded: c. 1570
- Consecrated: 1957
- Events: Fire: 1948

Architecture
- Functional status: Active
- Architect: Christon A. Christensen
- Architectural type: Long church
- Completed: 1957; 69 years ago

Specifications
- Capacity: 170
- Materials: Concrete

Administration
- Diocese: Agder og Telemark
- Deanery: Lister og Mandal prosti
- Parish: Farsund
- Norwegian Cultural Heritage Site
- Type: Church
- Status: Not protected
- ID: 84555

Herad Church (Norwegian: Herad kirke) is a parish church of the Church of Norway in Farsund Municipality in Agder county, Norway. It is located in the village of Sande, along the Åptafjorden. It is one of three churches for the Farsund parish which is part of the Lister og Mandal prosti (deanery) in the Diocese of Agder og Telemark. The white, concrete church was built in a long church design in 1957 using plans drawn up by the architect Christen A. Christensen. The church seats about 170 people.

== History ==
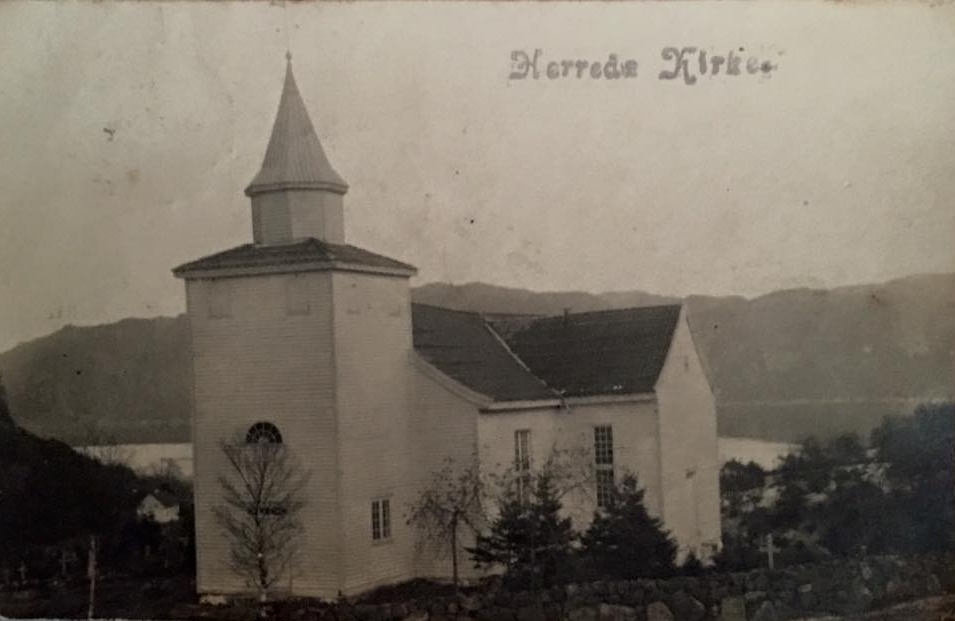
View of the old Herad Church (before 1957)

The first church was probably constructed in Herad in 1570. It was a timber-framed church with a rectangular nave and a narrower, rectangular chancel. In 1840, a new cruciform church was built about 20 metres (66 ft) to the southwest of the church. When the new church was completed, the old church was torn down. In 1948, the church burned down. As this was during the aftermath of World War II, funds were tight and the church was not rebuilt until 1957. The rebuilt church was built on the same site as the previous building.

== See also ==
- List of churches in Agder og Telemark
