= Þorvaldur =

- Gender: Male

Origin
- Region of origin: Iceland

Þorvaldur (English transliteration: Thorvaldur) is an Icelandic masculine given name.

Notable people with the name include:

- Þorvaldur Orri Árnason (born 2002), Icelandic basketball player
- Þorvaldur Davíð Kristjánsson (born 1983), Icelandic actor
- Þorvaldur Örlygsson (born 1966), Icelandic football midfielder
- Þorvaldur Gylfason (born 1951), Icelandic economist and composer
- Þorvaldur Makan Sigbjörnsson (born 1974), Icelandic footballer
- Þorvaldur Skúlason (1906–1984), Icelandic painter
- Þorvaldur Thoroddsen (1855–1921), Icelandic geologist and geographer

== See also ==
- Thorvald
- Torvald (disambiguation)
