= Thorvald =

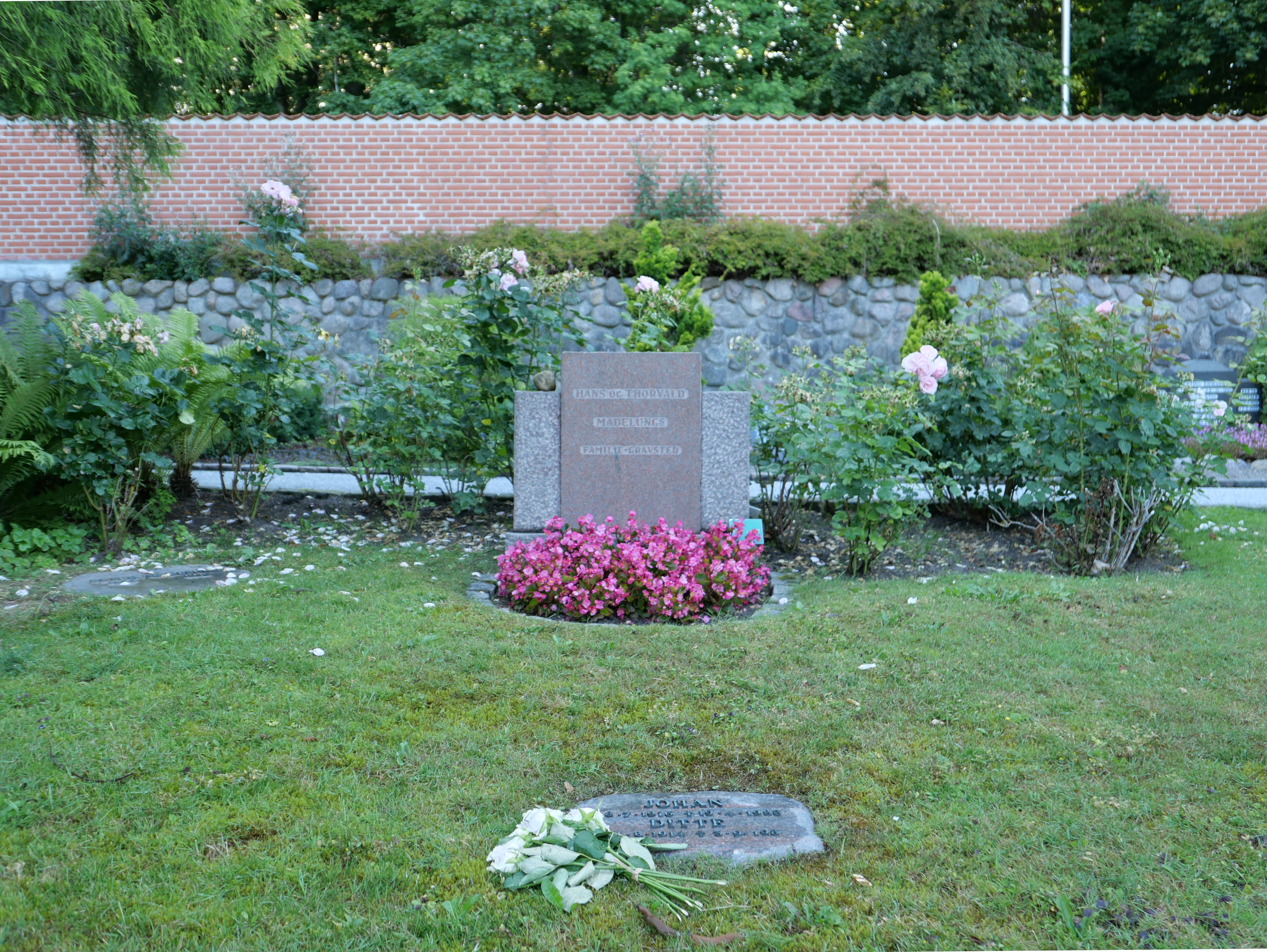
Hans and Thorvald Madelung's family grave at Humlebæk cemetery in Denmark.

Thorvald is from the Old Norse name Þórvaldr, which means "Thor's ruler". Despite this pagan origin, the name survived the conversion of Scandinavians to Christianity and remains popular up to the present.

Thorvald may refer to:

- Thorvald Aagaard (1877–1937), Danish composer, organist and college teacher
- Thorvald Astrup (1876–1940), Norwegian architect, known for industrial architecture
- Thorvald Asvaldsson (c. 10th century) father of Eric The Red and grandfather of Leif Erikson
- Thorwald Bergquist (1899–1972), Swedish politician
- Thorvald Bindesbøll (1846–1908), Danish architect and designer
- Thorvald Eigenbrod (1892–1977), Danish field hockey player
- Thorvald Ellegaard (1877–1954), Danish track racing cyclist
- Thorvald Eriksson, son of Eric the Red and brother of Leif Ericsson
- Thorvald Hansen, Norwegian Nordic combined skier
- Thorvald (hedgehog) (2000–2016), the world's oldest European hedgehog
- Thorvald Jørgensen (June 1867 – 1946), Danish architect
- Thorvald Lammers (1841–1922), Norwegian baritone singer, conductor, composer and biographer
- Thorvald Mejdell (1824–1908), Norwegian forester
- Glør Thorvald Mejdell (1851–1937), Norwegian barrister, judge and political writer
- Thorvald Mellingen (1935–2016), Norwegian engineer
- Thorvald Meyer (1818–1909), Norwegian businessman in real estate development in Oslo, and forestry
- Thorvald Olsen (1889–1938), Norwegian wrestler and sports official
- Thorvald Sørensen (1902–1973), Danish botanist and evolutionary biologist
- Thorvald Solberg (1852–1949), the first Register of Copyrights (1897–1930) in the United States Copyright Office
- Thorvald Stauning (1873–1942), first social democratic Prime Minister of Denmark
- Thorvald Steen (born 1954), Norwegian writer
- Thorvald Stoltenberg (1931–2018), prominent Norwegian politician
- Thorvald Strömberg (1931–2010), Finnish flatwater canoeist
- Thorvald N. Thiele (1838–1910), Danish astronomer, actuary and mathematician
- Thorvald Thronsen (1917–2003), Norwegian paramilitary officer
- Thorvald Wilhelmsen (1912–1996), Norwegian long-distance runner
- Jürgen Thorwald (1915–2006) a German writer, journalist and historian
- Turoldus, a variant of "Thorvald", was the traditional name of the author of the medieval Chanson de Roland (also Théroulde, Troude, Théroude, Thouroude)

== See also ==
- Torvald (disambiguation)
- Torvalds
- Þorvaldur
