= Torvalds =

Torvalds (Swedish: [ˈtǔːrvalds]) is a constructed Swedish/Finnish family name, created by journalist and poet Ole Torvalds (born Ole Torvald Elis Saxberg), who fashioned it from his middle name. It may refer to:

== People ==
- Ole Torvalds (1916–1995), journalist and poet
  - Nils Torvalds (born 1945), son of Ole; broadcast journalist, writer and politician
    - Linus Torvalds (born 1969), son of Nils; software engineer and creator of the Linux kernel, who now works and lives in the U.S.
- Meta Torvalds (1922–2012), wife of Ole; journalist

== Other ==
- 9793 Torvalds, asteroid named for Linus Torvalds
- Tanenbaum–Torvalds debate, debate between Andrew S. Tanenbaum and Linus Torvalds about Linux and kernel architecture in general

== See also ==
- Torvald (disambiguation)
