= Thorvald Mellingen =

Norwegian engineer

Thorvald L. Mellingen (8 October 1935 – 29 October 2016) was a Norwegian engineer.

He graduated from the Norwegian Institute of Technology in 1961, and then worked in the companies Norsk Bergverk and Sydvaranger. He was then hired in Norsk Hydro in 1965, and took further education at the Institut français du pétrole. In 1969 he went on to Norges Teknisk-Naturvitenskapelige Forskningsråd. From 1976 to 1982 he worked in Saga Petroleum, overseeing construction at the Sèmè oil field in Benin. In 1983 he was hired as assistant director of NUTEC. He was then CEO from 1984 to 1998, except for a period between 1991 and 1992 when he was CEO of Statoil Nigeria. From 2001 he was an advisor for the Angolan Ministry of Petroleum.

Thorvald Mellingen was a volunteer and embassador [sic] of DIDI International Therapeutic Children Theater for war affected children. In 2005 Mellingen empowered the creation of the women professional center in Bamako, Mali.

Mellingen was a member of the board of the Norwegian Petroleum Society, and was involved in the Norwegian Support Committee for Chechnya. He was a Knight, 1st Class, of the Swedish Order of the Polar Star, and lived in Laksevåg.
