= Equinor operations by country =

This is an overview of Equinor's operations in various countries. Equinor is a Norwegian petroleum company.

== Algeria ==
Equinor is a participant with BP and Sonatrach in two gas fields in Algeria; In Amenas and In Salah. It also operates the Hassi Mouina exploration block. Equinor's has offices in the capital Algiers.

== Angola ==
Statoil has operational interests in four blocs (#4, #15, #17 and #31) in Angola. Statoil's Angola offices are located in the capital Luanda.

== Belgium ==
The receiving plant for the pipeline Zeepipe is located in Zeebrügge, Belgium while Statoil's offices are located in Mechelen, near Brussels.

== Brazil ==
Statoil received in 2005 two deepwater block on the Brazilian continental shelf. Statoil's offices are located in Rio de Janeiro. Statoil and Petrobras have signed memorandum of understanding (MoU) to strengthening their cooperation in Brazil. The intention of the MoU is to evaluate joint participation in future tenders for exploration areas and to increase upstream collaboration in producing fields in the Santos and Campos offshore basins.

== Canada ==
Statoil constructed the Leismer SAGD Facility in Alberta, Canada, and has operations on the Canadian East coast, offshore Newfoundland. In July 2017, Statoil announced that it had hit dry wells in a prospect in the Atlantic offshore Newfoundland. In 2016 Statoil sold the Leismer oil sand operation to Athabasca Oil. The cash and share sale was concluded in January 2017 for an estimated $800 million, thereby exiting the oil sands business "almost certainly".

== China ==
In China Statoil is the operator of the Lufeng 22-1 oil field located in the South China Sea. Statoil's offices are located in Shekou. The Lufeng 22-1 oilfield project is the first Chinese Offshore oilfield to be abandoned, shutting down officially on 16 June 2009.

== Denmark ==
In addition to 261 service stations, 51 1-2-3 stations and a network of distribution of petroleum products in Denmark, Statoil also owns a refinery in Kalundborg and is performing exploration on the Faroe Islands continental shelf. Statoil's offices are located in Copenhagen.

== Germany ==
In Germany Statoil operates the Etzel gas store and the Emden-Etzel transportation system. These include processing plants in Dornum, Emden and Etzel. Statoil's offices are located in Emden.

== Libya ==
After establishing itself in Libya in 2005, Statoil has one fully owned exploration contract and one in partnership with British Gas.

The share in the Mabruk oil field, has been reduced to 5% (25% was owned before Libyan authorities ratified contracts in 2009 and 2010, according to B.G. Pedersen).

1.5 billion Norwegian kroner was its investment in Libya, and 1.5 billion was paid in Libyan taxes, between 2005 and 2010.

Statoil closed their Libya office (in Tripoli), in February 2011.

== Norway ==
Equinor is the largest operator on the Norwegian continental shelf, with 60% of total production. The fields operated are Glitne, Gullfaks, Heidrun, Huldra, Kristin, Kvitebjørn, Mikkel, Norne, Sleipner, Snorre, Snøhvit, Statfjord, Sygna, Tordis, Troll, Veslefrikk, Vigdis, Visund, Volve and Åsgard. Equinor also operates a chain of service stations and other energy related products. The company has processing plants at Kolsnes, Kårstø, Mongstad and Tjeldbergodden. The company's global headquarters are in Stavanger, and it has other offices around Norway.

== Poland ==
Equinor has been present in Poland since 1992, initially operating a network of fuel service stations under the Statoil brand. In 2012, the company divested its retail business and shifted its focus to renewable energy projects.

Currently, Equinor’s activities in Poland are primarily focused on:

- Offshore wind – development of the Bałtyk 1, 2 and 3 offshore wind projects in partnership with Polenergia,
- Onshore renewable energy – through its subsidiary Wento, which develops photovoltaic and onshore wind projects and battery energy storage (BESS),
- Gas supply – sales of gas to Poland from the Norwegian Continental Shelf, transported via Baltic Pipe,
- Crude oil supplies – Equinor delivers Norwegian crude oil to Poland, supporting energy security and a diversified energy supply.

Equinor’s offices in Poland are located in Warsaw and Gdańsk. A dedicated offshore wind O&M base is in Łeba.

== Singapore ==
In Singapore Statoil has a sales office for crude oil, refined products and natural gas liquids.

== United Kingdom ==
In the United Kingdom Statoil participates in production on the UK continental shelf. In addition Statoil has a trading office for crude oil. Statoil's offices are located in the capital London.

== United States ==
In 2005 Statoil ventured into deepwater oil production in the Gulf of Mexico. In November 2008, Statoil paid $3.375 billion for a 32.5% interest in 1.8 million net acres of oil and gas leases in the Marcellus Shale gas trend in the Appalachian Basin. Statoil's production offices are located in Houston, Texas while a trading and renewables office is located in Stamford, Connecticut

. In 2011, Statoil bought Brigham Exploration for $4.4 Billion to gain access to its oil shale operations in North Dakota's Bakken formation. An accountant report estimated that Equinor had lost NOK 200 billion on its US operations.

After receiving approval from NYSERDA, Equinor is developing the 816MW Empire Wind windfarm in New York in BOEM lease area OCS-A 0512 (Hudson North) in the New York Bight 14 miles (23 km) south of Jones Beach, Long Island. About 60-80 turbines are planned. In January 2021 BP acquired a 50% stakehold in the project. The project will support the development of manufacturing at the Port of Albany.

== Former List of Operations ==
- Turkey
- Venezuela
- United Arab Emirates
- Sweden
- Saudi Arabia
- Russia
  - As a result of the International sanctions during the Russo-Ukrainian War
- Qatar
- Nigeria
- Mexico
- Lithuania
- Latvia
- Kazakhstan
- Ireland
- Iran
- France
- Estonia
- Egypt
- Azerbaijan
