= Shades of orange =

Varieties of the color orange

Orange
- Wavelength: 585–620 nm

Common connotations
- Autumn, Halloween, Thanksgiving, fertility, warmth

Color coordinates
- Hex triplet: #FF8000
- sRGB^{B} (r, g, b): (255, 128, 0)
- HSV (h, s, v): (30°, 100%, 100%)
- CIELCh_{uv} (L, C, h): (67, 123, 30°)
- Source: By definition
- B: Normalized to [0–255] (byte)

In optics, orange has a wavelength between approximately 585 and 620 nm and a hue of 30° in HSV color space. In the RGB color space it is a secondary color numerically halfway between gamma-compressed red and yellow, as can be seen in the RGB color wheel. The complementary color of orange is azure. Orange pigments are largely in the ochre or cadmium families, and absorb mostly blue light.

Varieties of the color orange may differ in hue, chroma (also called saturation, intensity, or colorfulness) or lightness (or value, tone, or brightness), or in two or three of these qualities. Variations in value are also called tints and shades, a tint being an orange or other hue mixed with white, a shade being mixed with black. A large selection of these various colors is shown below.

== Orange (color wheel) ==
Orange (color wheel)

Color coordinates
- Hex triplet: #FF8000
- sRGB^{B} (r, g, b): (255, 128, 0)
- HSV (h, s, v): (30°, 100%, 100%)
- CIELCh_{uv} (L, C, h): (67, 123, 30°)
- Source: HTML Color Chart @30
- ISCC–NBS descriptor: Vivid reddish orange
- B: Normalized to [0–255] (byte)

The color known as color wheel orange is the tone of orange that is a pure chroma on the HSV color wheel, the expression of which is known as the RGB color wheel, exactly halfway between red and yellow. The complementary color of orange is azure.

== Web colors ==
=== Orange (web color) ===
Orange (web color)

Color coordinates
- Hex triplet: #FFA500
- sRGB^{B} (r, g, b): (255, 165, 0)
- HSV (h, s, v): (39°, 100%, 100%)
- CIELCh_{uv} (L, C, h): (75, 105, 45°)
- Source: X11
- ISCC–NBS descriptor: Strong orange
- B: Normalized to [0–255] (byte)

The web color called orange is defined in CSS as the hex triplet FFA500.

=== Dark orange (web color) ===
Dark orange

Color coordinates
- Hex triplet: #FF8C00
- sRGB^{B} (r, g, b): (255, 140, 0)
- HSV (h, s, v): (33°, 100%, 100%)
- CIELCh_{uv} (L, C, h): (69, 116, 34°)
- Source: X11
- ISCC–NBS descriptor: Vivid orange
- B: Normalized to [0–255] (byte)

There is a web color called dark orange.

== Aerospace and safety ==
=== Safety orange ===
Safety Orange
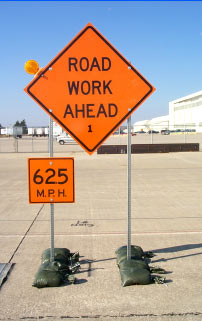
- A safety orange warning sign for road construction sites.

Color coordinates
- Hex triplet: #FF7900
- sRGB^{B} (r, g, b): (255, 121, 0)
- HSV (h, s, v): (28°, 100%, 100%)
- CIELCh_{uv} (L, C, h): (66, 127, 28°)
- Source: ANSI Z535
- ISCC–NBS descriptor: Vivid reddish orange
- B: Normalized to [0–255] (byte)

Safety orange (also known as blaze orange, and a number of other names) was defined in ANSI standard Z535.1–1998 and is commonly used in a wide variety of contexts to warn of hazards, including: high-viz clothing, road cones, and as the background color in safety warning notices.

=== International orange (Aerospace) ===
International Orange (Aerospace)

Color coordinates
- Hex triplet: #FF4F00
- sRGB^{B} (r, g, b): (255, 79, 0)
- HSV (h, s, v): (19°, 100%, 100%)
- CIELCh_{uv} (L, C, h): (59, 152, 18°)
- ISCC–NBS descriptor: Vivid reddish orange
- B: Normalized to [0–255] (byte)

A shade of orange known as International orange is used in the aerospace industry to set objects apart from their surroundings, similar to Safety orange, but deeper and with a more reddish tone. It was the color used for the Space Shuttle pressure suits.

=== International orange (Golden Gate Bridge) ===
International Orange (Golden Gate Bridge)
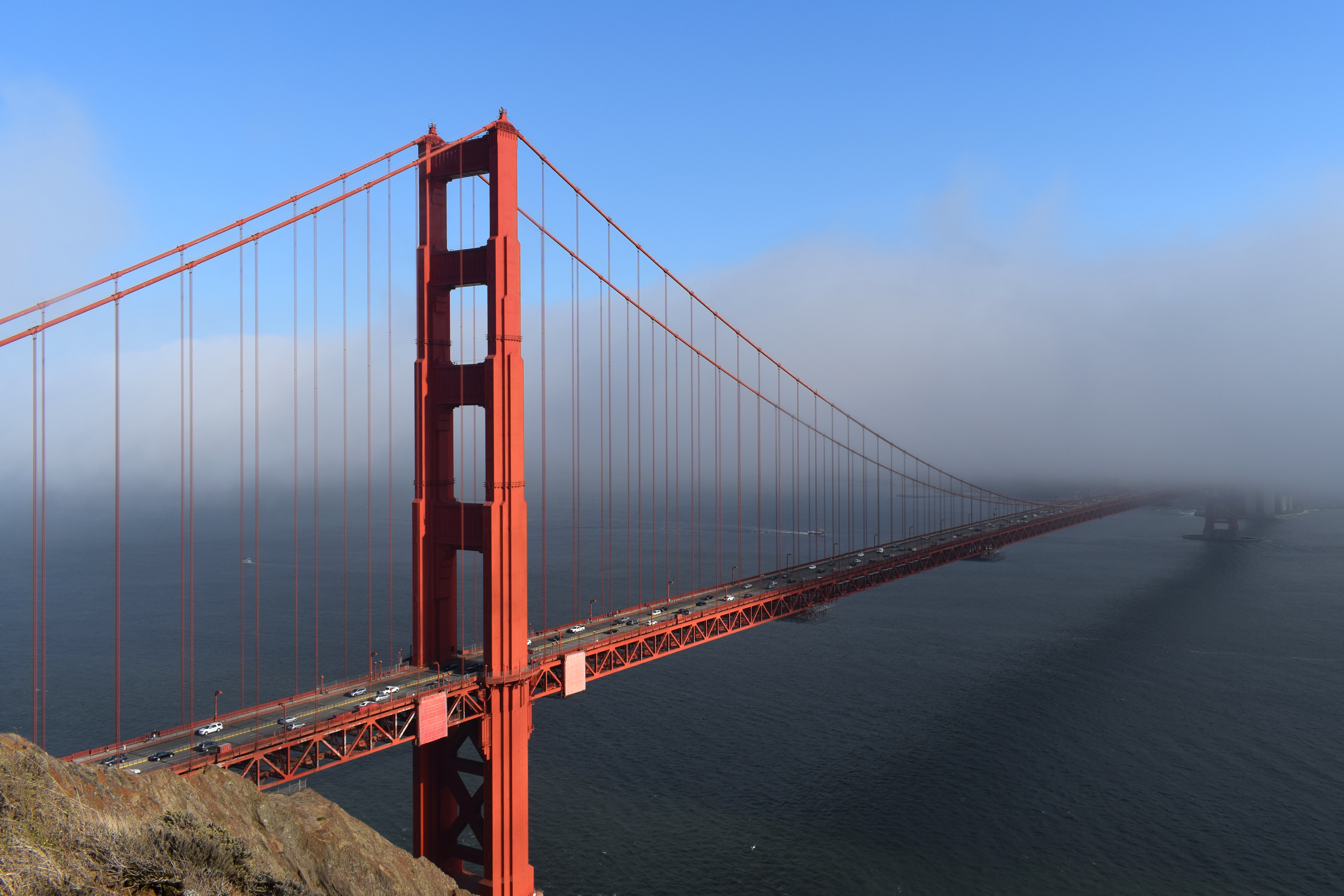
- The Golden Gate Bridge partially covered in fog

Color coordinates
- Hex triplet: #F04A00
- sRGB^{B} (r, g, b): (240, 74, 0)
- HSV (h, s, v): (18°, 100%, 94%)
- CIELCh_{uv} (L, C, h): (56, 143, 18°)
- Source: GGB
- ISCC–NBS descriptor: Vivid reddish orange
- B: Normalized to [0–255] (byte)

The tone of international orange used to paint the Golden Gate Bridge in San Francisco, California is slightly lighter than the standard International orange used by military contractors and in engineering (shown below), thus increasing its visibility to ships. The 25 de Abril Bridge in Lisbon, Portugal also uses this color.

== Additional definitions of orange ==
=== Orange (Pantone) ===
Orange (Pantone)

Color coordinates
- Hex triplet: #FF5800
- sRGB^{B} (r, g, b): (255, 88, 0)
- HSV (h, s, v): (21°, 100%, 100%)
- CIELCh_{uv} (L, C, h): (60, 147, 20°)
- Source: Pantone TPX
- ISCC–NBS descriptor: Vivid reddish orange
- B: Normalized to [0–255] (byte)

The color called orange in Pantone is taken from the "Pantone Textile Paper eXtended (TPX)" color list, color #021 TPX—Orange.

=== Orange (Crayola) ===
Orange (Crayola)

Color coordinates
- Hex triplet: #FF7538
- sRGB^{B} (r, g, b): (255, 117, 56)
- HSV (h, s, v): (18°, 78%, 100%)
- CIELCh_{uv} (L, C, h): (65, 122, 24°)
- Source: Crayola
- ISCC–NBS descriptor: Vivid reddish orange
- B: Normalized to [0–255] (byte)

Orange was one of the original colors formulated by Crayola in 1903.

== Other variations of orange ==
=== Alloy orange ===
Alloy orange

Color coordinates
- Hex triplet: #C46210
- sRGB^{B} (r, g, b): (196, 98, 16)
- HSV (h, s, v): (27°, 92%, 77%)
- CIELCh_{uv} (L, C, h): (52, 93, 30°)
- Source: Crayola
- ISCC–NBS descriptor: Deep orange
- B: Normalized to [0–255] (byte)

Alloy orange is one of the colors in the special set of metallic Crayola crayons called Metallic FX, the colors of which were formulated by Crayola in 2001.

Although this is supposed to be a metallic color, there is no mechanism for displaying metallic colors on a computer.

=== Apricot ===
Apricot
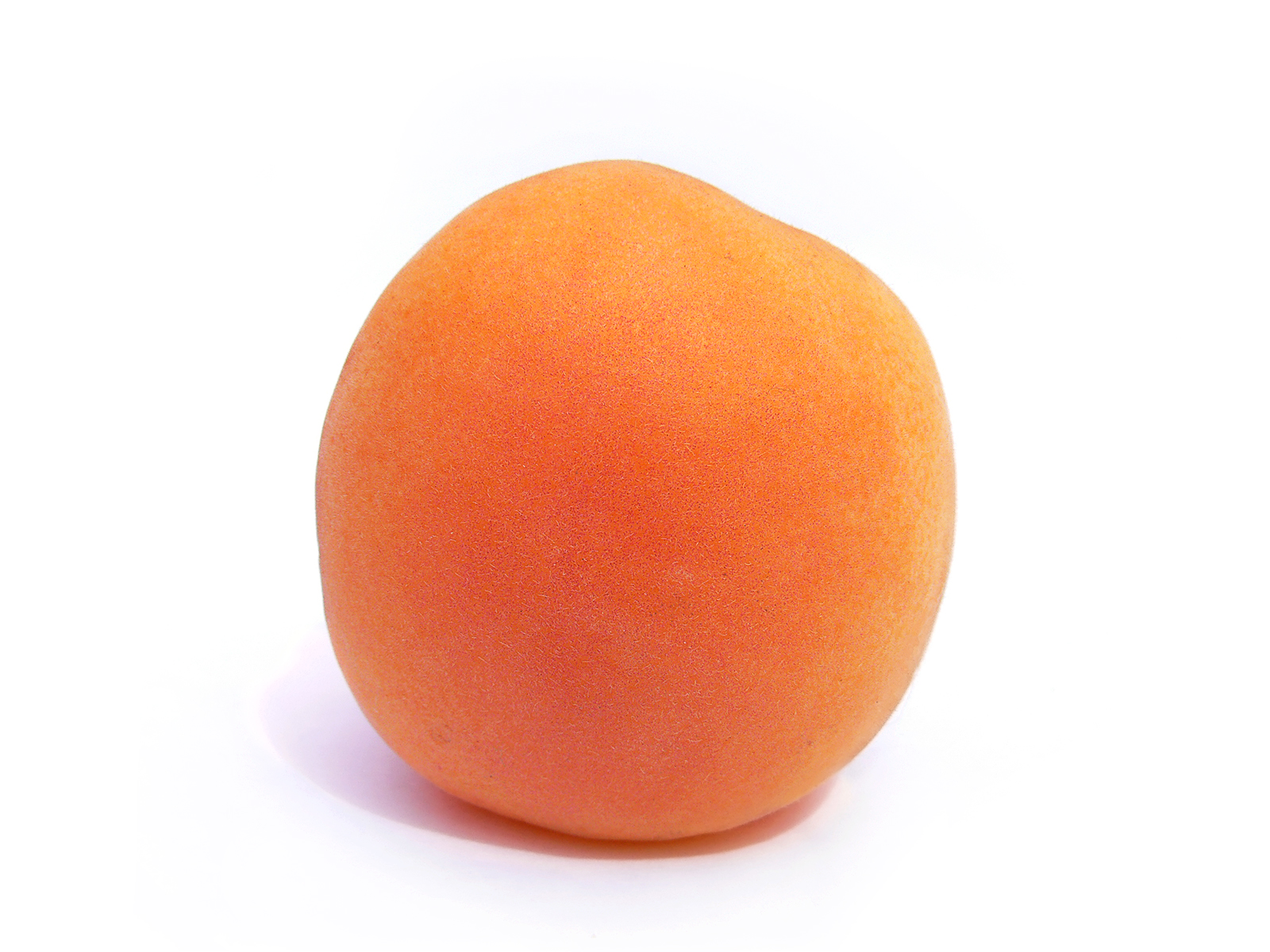
- An apricot fruit

Color coordinates
- Hex triplet: #FBCEB1
- sRGB^{B} (r, g, b): (251, 206, 177)
- HSV (h, s, v): (24°, 29%, 98%)
- CIELCh_{uv} (L, C, h): (86, 40, 41°)
- Source: Maerz and Paul
- ISCC–NBS descriptor: Pale orange yellow
- B: Normalized to [0–255] (byte)

Apricot has been in use as a color name since 1851.

=== Apricot Peach ===
Apricot Peach

Color coordinates
- Hex triplet: #F8C8B0
- sRGB^{B} (r, g, b): (248, 200, 176)
- HSV (h, s, v): (20°, 29%, 97%)
- CIELCh_{uv} (L, C, h): (84, 40, 36°)
- Source: hexcolor.co
- ISCC–NBS descriptor: Pale light grayish tangelo
- B: Normalized to [0–255] (byte)

Apricot Peach is a pale light grayish tangelo color.

=== Atomic tangerine ===
Atomic tangerine

Color coordinates
- Hex triplet: #FF9966
- sRGB^{B} (r, g, b): (255, 153, 102)
- HSV (h, s, v): (20°, 60%, 100%)
- CIELCh_{uv} (L, C, h): (73, 90, 30°)
- Source: Crayola
- ISCC–NBS descriptor: Strong yellowish pink
- B: Normalized to [0–255] (byte)

Atomic tangerine was formulated by Crayola in 1990.

(Atomic tangerine is supposed to be a fluorescent color, but there is no mechanism for showing fluorescence on a flat computer screen.)

=== Brown ===
Brown

Color coordinates
- Hex triplet: #964B00
- sRGB^{B} (r, g, b): (150, 75, 0)
- HSV (h, s, v): (30°, 100%, 59%)
- CIELCh_{uv} (L, C, h): (40, 72, 31°)
- ISCC–NBS descriptor: Strong brown
- B: Normalized to [0–255] (byte)

Brown, although an independent color term, actually combines the orange hue (or close to orange) with low brightness. It can be described as an especially dark orange or, in painters' terminology, a deep shade of orange.

The first recorded use of brown as a color name in English was in about 1000 AD in the Metres of Boethius.

=== Burnt orange ===
Burnt orange

Color coordinates
- Hex triplet: #BF5700
- sRGB^{B} (r, g, b): (191, 87, 0)
- HSV (h, s, v): (27°, 100%, 75%)
- CIELCh_{uv} (L, C, h): (49, 97, 27°)
- Source: University of Texas at Austin
- ISCC–NBS descriptor: Deep reddish orange
- B: Normalized to [0–255] (byte)

Burnt orange has been used as a color name for this medium dark shade of orange since 1915.

This color is one variation that is used as a school color of The University of Texas at Austin, Auburn University, and Virginia Tech.

Burnt orange is not a standard color; for example, it is defined differently by Auburn University and the University of Texas at Austin. The National Hockey League's San Jose Sharks use burnt orange as a secondary color, and it is one of three colors of the National Football League's Cleveland Browns. The Chicago Bears also use it as an alternate color.

Burnt orange was used by the University of Montana prior to 1996 and Oklahoma State University for its football uniforms from 1973 through 1983.

Burnt orange was popular in interior design in the 1970s. Burnt orange was used to decorate the Oval Office during the Presidency of Gerald Ford.

Burnt orange is also used to colour cylinders filled with the refrigerant R407C.

=== Butterscotch ===
Butterscotch
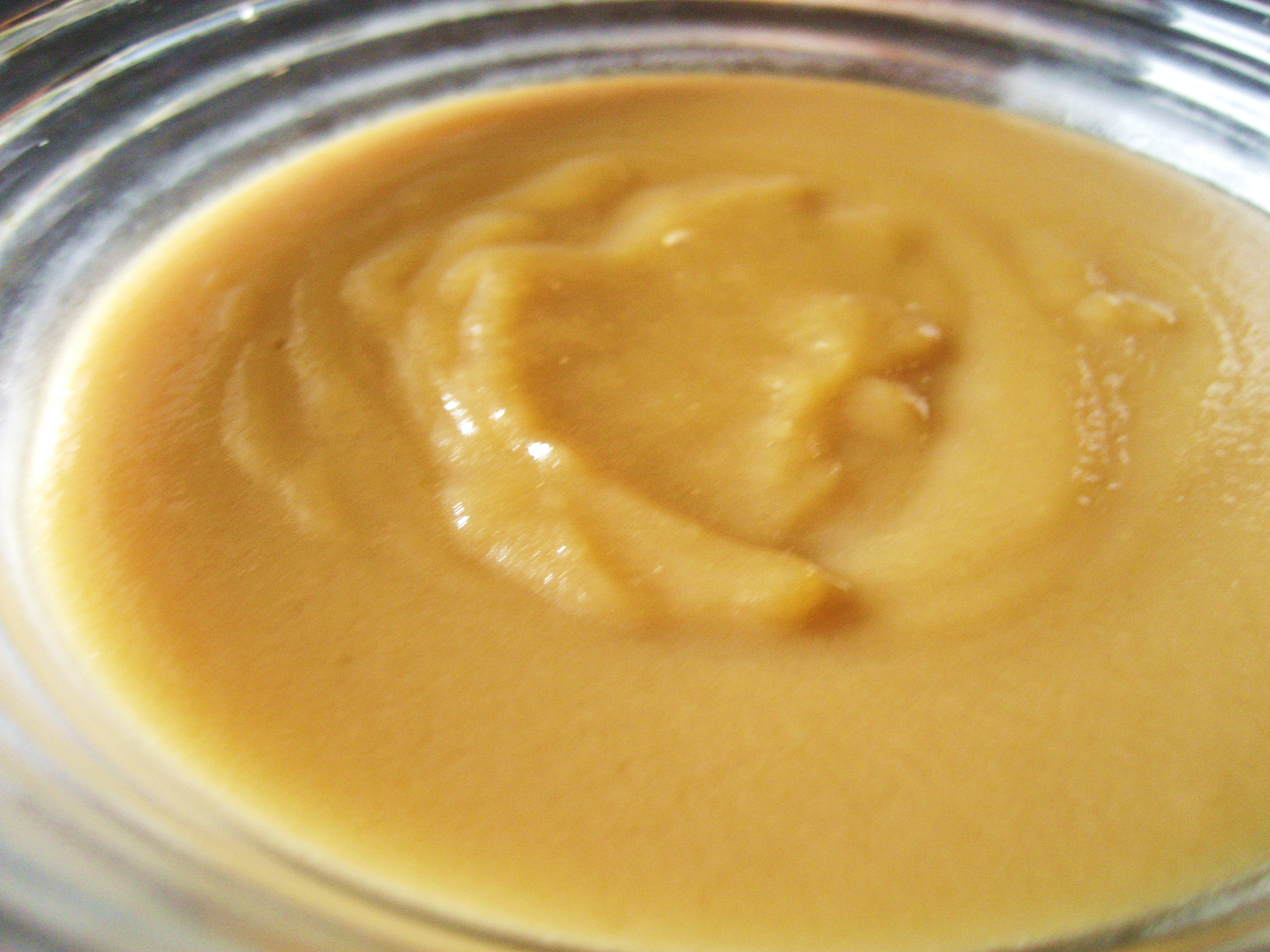
- Butterscotch pudding

Color coordinates
- Hex triplet: #E09540
- sRGB^{B} (r, g, b): (224, 149, 64)
- HSV (h, s, v): (32°, 71%, 88%)
- CIELCh_{uv} (L, C, h): (68, 82, 43°)
- Source: Pantone
- ISCC–NBS descriptor: Strong orange
- B: Normalized to [0–255] (byte)

Butterscotch is a color that resembles butterscotch.

=== Carrot orange ===
Carrot orange
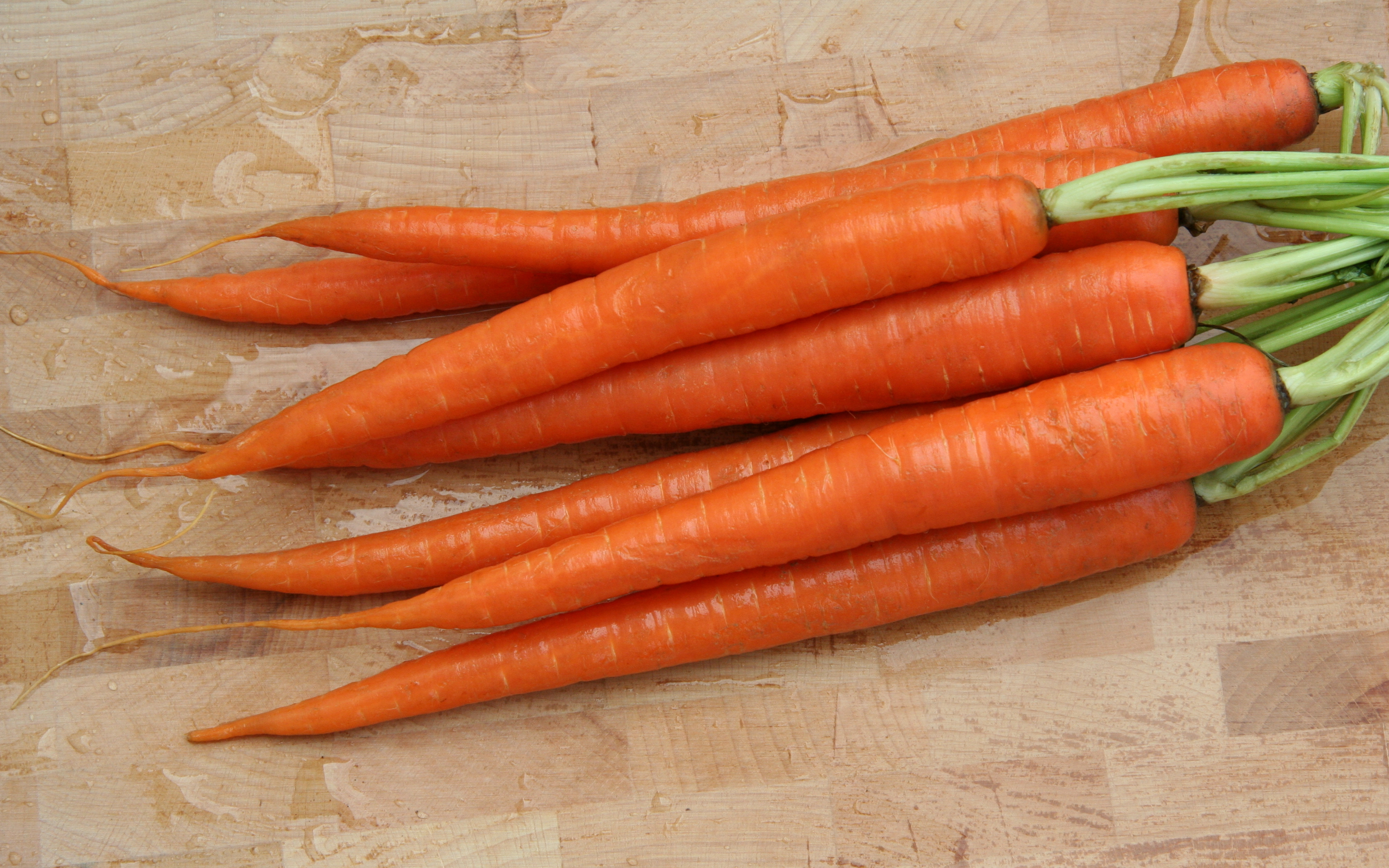

Color coordinates
- Hex triplet: #ED9121
- sRGB^{B} (r, g, b): (237, 145, 33)
- HSV (h, s, v): (33°, 86%, 93%)
- CIELCh_{uv} (L, C, h): (68, 99, 40°)
- Source: Maerz and Paul
- ISCC–NBS descriptor: Strong orange
- B: Normalized to [0–255] (byte)

Carrot orange is a tint of orange that is a representation of the color of the raw carrot vegetable.

The first recorded use of carrot orange as a color name in English was in 1684.

=== Coral ===
Coral
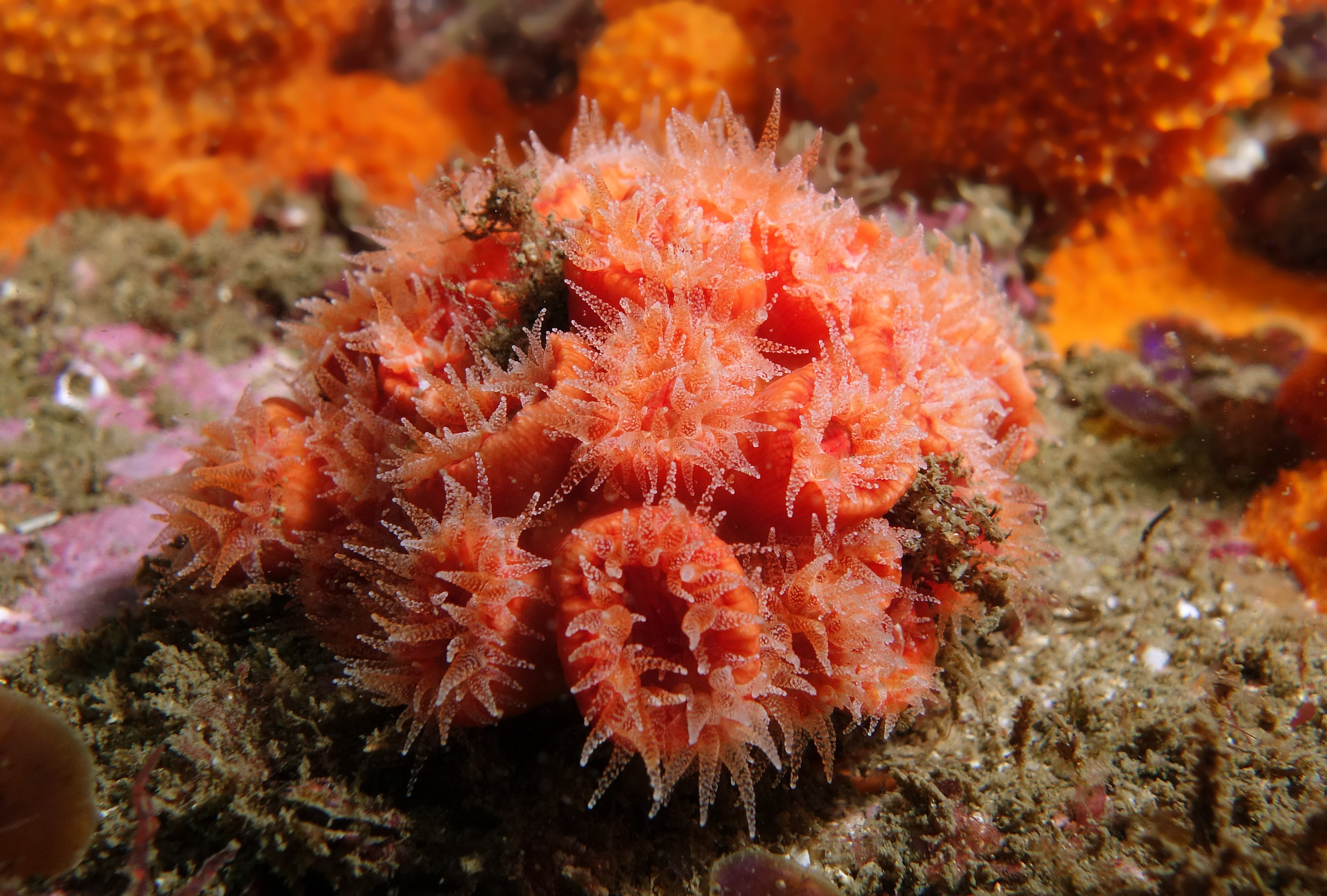
- Orange cup coral

Color coordinates
- Hex triplet: #FF7F50
- sRGB^{B} (r, g, b): (255, 127, 80)
- HSV (h, s, v): (16°, 69%, 100%)
- CIELCh_{uv} (L, C, h): (67, 110, 24°)
- Source: HTML/CSS; X11 color names
- ISCC–NBS descriptor: Vivid reddish orange
- B: Normalized to [0–255] (byte)

The web color coral is a shade of orange. The first recorded use of coral as a color name in English was in 1513.

=== Giants orange ===
Giants orange

Color coordinates
- Hex triplet: #FE5A1D
- sRGB^{B} (r, g, b): (254, 90, 29)
- HSV (h, s, v): (16°, 89%, 100%)
- CIELCh_{uv} (L, C, h): (60, 142, 19°)
- ISCC–NBS descriptor: Vivid reddish orange
- B: Normalized to [0–255] (byte)

The color Giants orange symbolizes, along with black and cream, the San Francisco Giants baseball team.

=== Goldenrod ===
Goldenrod
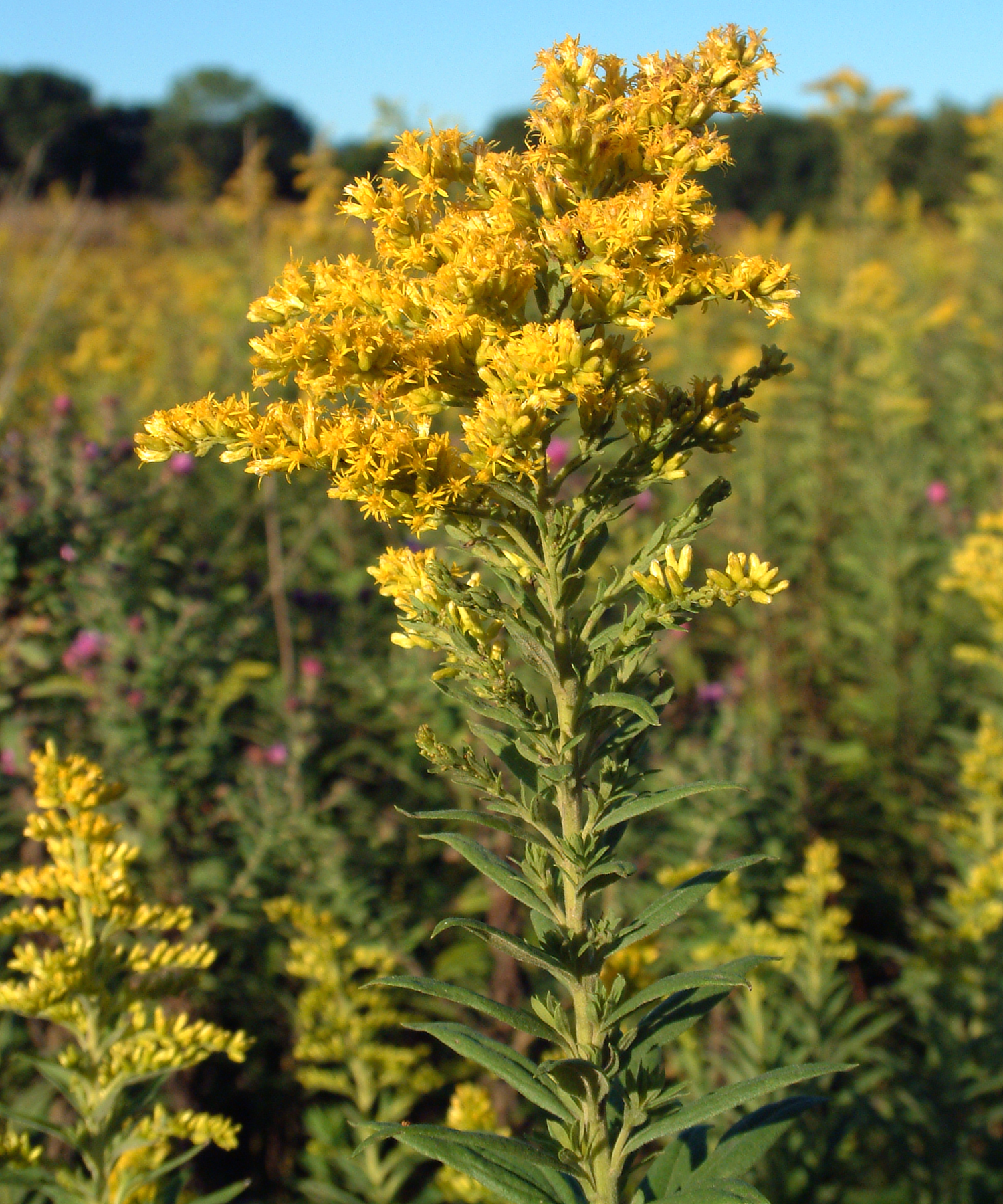
- Goldenrods in rural Fountain County, Indiana

Color coordinates
- Hex triplet: #DAA520
- sRGB^{B} (r, g, b): (218, 165, 32)
- HSV (h, s, v): (43°, 85%, 85%)
- CIELCh_{uv} (L, C, h): (71, 83, 58°)
- Source: X11
- ISCC–NBS descriptor: Strong yellow
- B: Normalized to [0–255] (byte)

The web color goldenrod is a representation of the color of some of the deeper gold colored goldenrod flowers.

The first recorded use of goldenrod as a color name in English was in 1915.

=== Hunyadi yellow ===
Hunyadi yellow

Color coordinates
- Hex triplet: #E8AC41
- sRGB^{B} (r, g, b): (232, 172, 65)
- HSV (h, s, v): (38°, 72%, 91%)
- CIELCh_{uv} (L, C, h): (74, 82, 54°)
- Source: ColorSwatches
- ISCC–NBS descriptor: Strong orange yellow
- B: Normalized to [0–255] (byte)

The web color Hunyadi yellow or Pear gold is represented on the Hunyadi coat of arms.

=== Light orange ===
Light orange

Color coordinates
- Hex triplet: #FED8B1
- sRGB^{B} (r, g, b): (254, 216, 177)
- HSV (h, s, v): (30°, 30%, 100%)
- CIELCh_{uv} (L, C, h): (89, 42, 51°)
- Source: Crayola C.P.
- ISCC–NBS descriptor: Pale orange yellow
- B: Normalized to [0–255] (byte)

A light orange color was formulated for Crayola colored pencils.

=== Melon ===
Melon
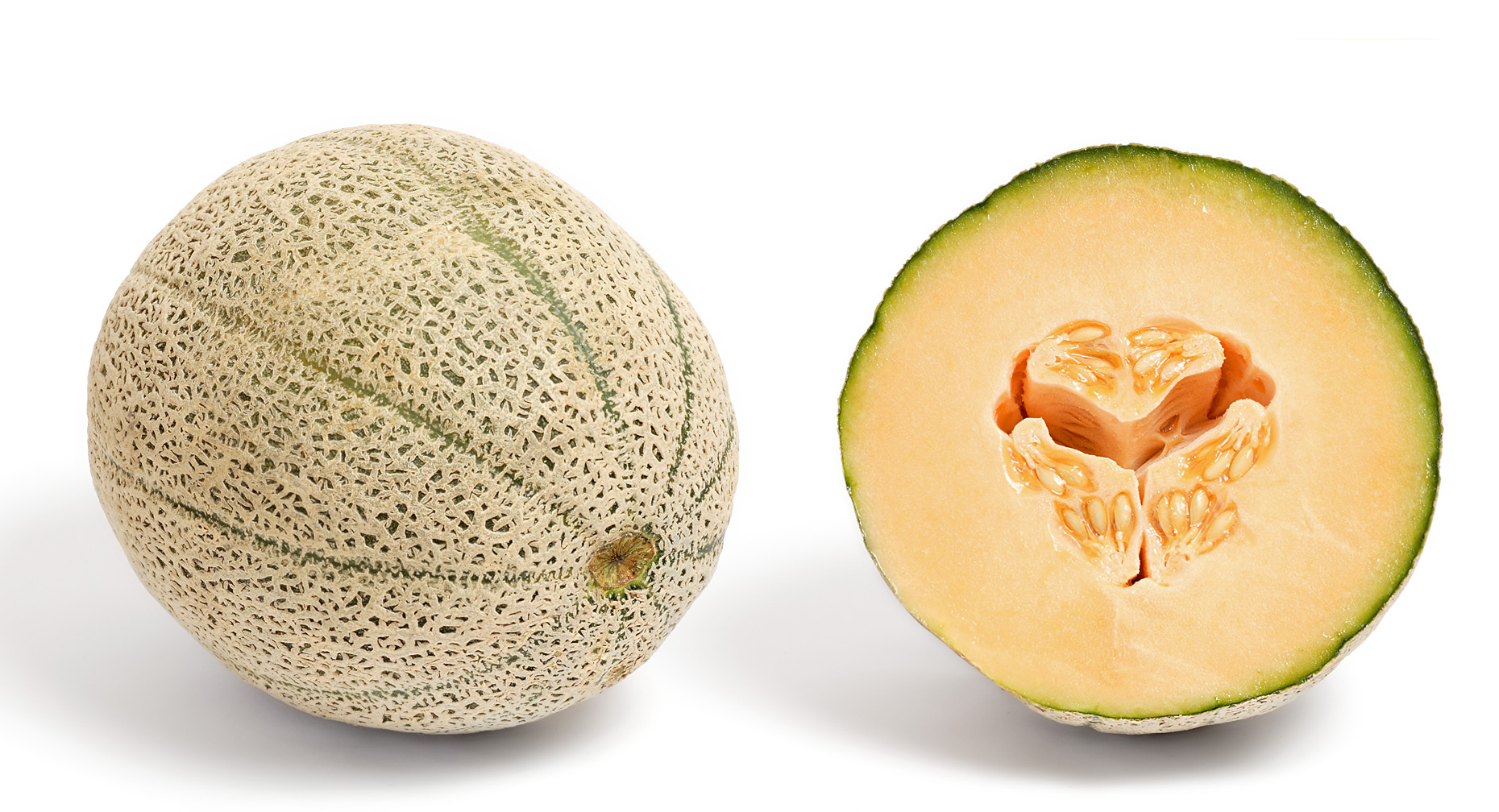
- A cantaloupe from Australia

Color coordinates
- Hex triplet: #FDBCB4
- sRGB^{B} (r, g, b): (253, 188, 180)
- HSV (h, s, v): (7°, 29%, 99%)
- CIELCh_{uv} (L, C, h): (82, 45, 19°)
- Source: Crayola
- ISCC–NBS descriptor: Moderate yellowish pink
- B: Normalized to [0–255] (byte)

The color melon is a representation of the color of the interior flesh of a cantaloupe, the most commonly consumed melon.

The first recorded use of melon as a color name in English was in 1892.

By 1921, the color melon was associated with fullness of life, vivacity, magnetism, impressibility, and susceptibility.

In 1949, melon was formulated as one of the Crayola colors.

=== Orange peel ===
Orange peel
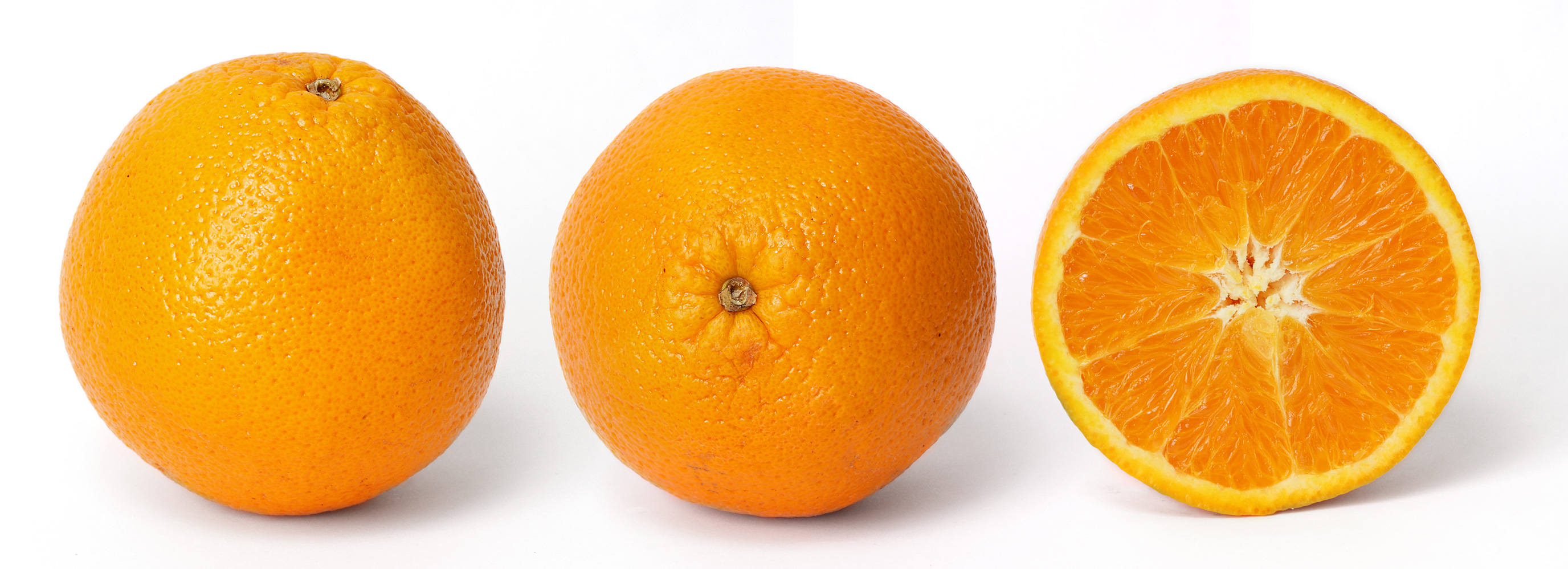
- Orange fruit and cross section

Color coordinates
- Hex triplet: #FF9F00
- sRGB^{B} (r, g, b): (255, 159, 0)
- HSV (h, s, v): (37°, 100%, 100%)
- CIELCh_{uv} (L, C, h): (74, 107, 42°)
- Source: Maerz and Paul
- ISCC–NBS descriptor: Strong orange
- B: Normalized to [0–255] (byte)

A discussion of the difference between the color orange (the color halfway between red and yellow, shown above as color wheel orange) and the color orange peel (the actual color of the outer skin of an orange), may be found in Maerz and Paul. Orange peel is the color halfway between orange (color wheel) and amber on the color wheel.

The first recorded use of orange peel as a color name in English was in 1839.

=== Papaya whip ===
Papaya Whip
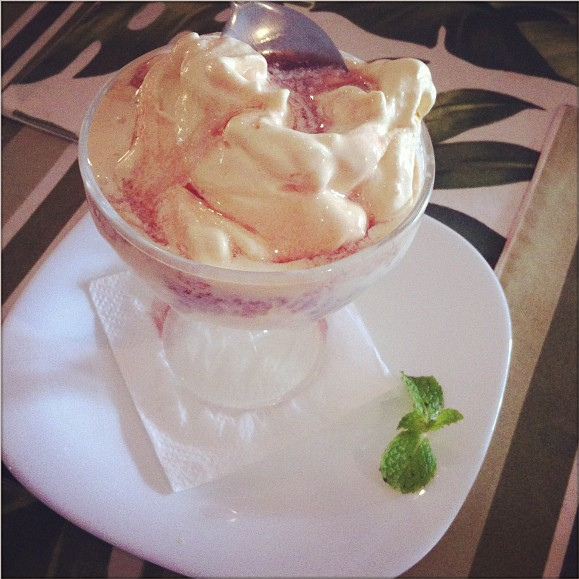
- Papaya cream with crème de cassis

Color coordinates
- Hex triplet: #FFEFD5
- sRGB^{B} (r, g, b): (255, 239, 213)
- HSV (h, s, v): (37°, 16%, 100%)
- CIELCh_{uv} (L, C, h): (95, 24, 63°)
- Source: X11
- ISCC–NBS descriptor: Pale yellow
- B: Normalized to [0–255] (byte)

The web color papaya whip is a pale tint of orange.

=== Peach ===
Peach
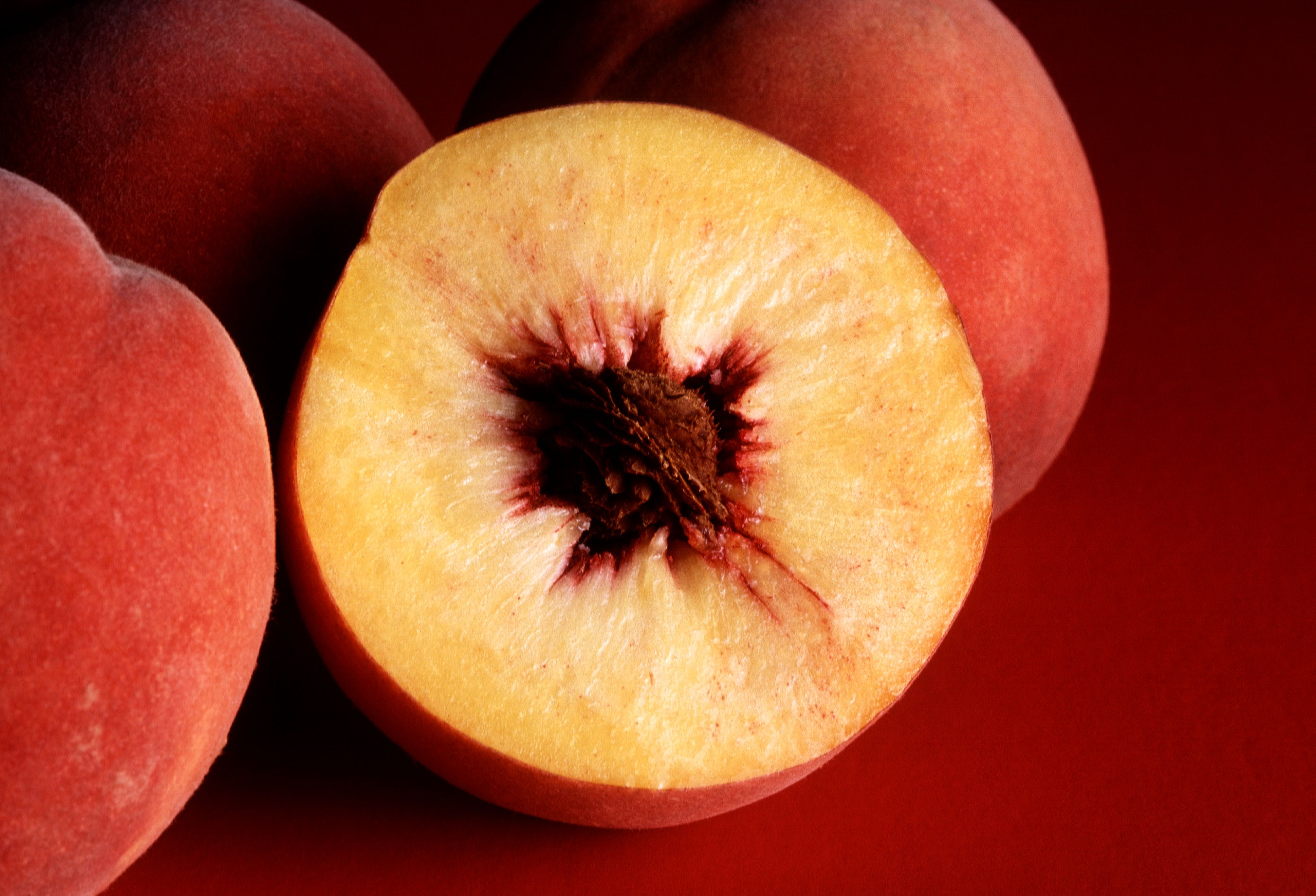
- The colour peach represents the flesh of the peach fruit

Color coordinates
- Hex triplet: #FFE5B4
- sRGB^{B} (r, g, b): (255, 229, 180)
- HSV (h, s, v): (39°, 29%, 100%)
- CIELCh_{uv} (L, C, h): (92, 42, 63°)
- Source: Maerz and Paul
- ISCC–NBS descriptor: Pale yellow
- B: Normalized to [0–255] (byte)

The first recorded use of peach as a color name in English was in 1588.

=== Persian orange ===
Persian orange

Color coordinates
- Hex triplet: #D99058
- sRGB^{B} (r, g, b): (217, 144, 88)
- HSV (h, s, v): (26°, 59%, 85%)
- CIELCh_{uv} (L, C, h): (66, 71, 38°)
- Source: ISCC-NBS
- ISCC–NBS descriptor: Moderate orange
- B: Normalized to [0–255] (byte)

Persian orange is a color used in pottery and Persian carpets in Iran.

The first recorded use of Persian orange as a color name in English was in 1892.

Orange pudding (milk added to pureed oranges that is mixed in a blender with flour and slowly boiled on a stovetop) is colored Persian orange, assuming no food coloring is added. Allis-Chalmers tractors have been colored Persian orange since 1928 so that, even when caked with dirt, they could still be distinguished from landscape features.

=== Persimmon ===
Persimmon
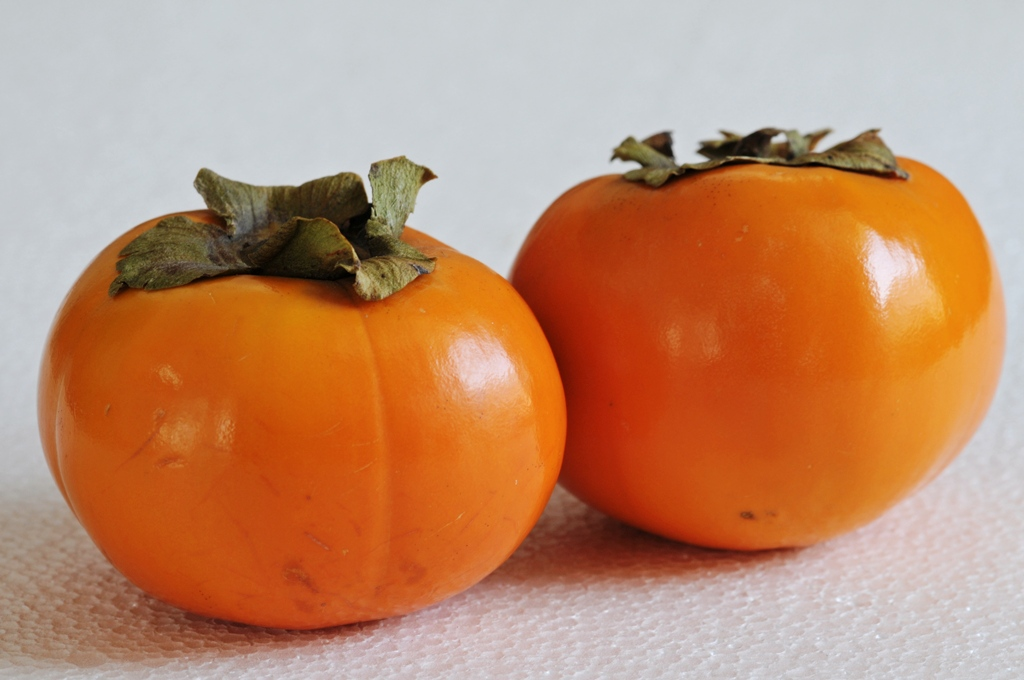
- A ripe persimmon fruit

Color coordinates
- Hex triplet: #EC5800
- sRGB^{B} (r, g, b): (236, 88, 0)
- HSV (h, s, v): (22°, 100%, 93%)
- CIELCh_{uv} (L, C, h): (57, 132, 21°)
- Source: Maerz and Paul
- ISCC–NBS descriptor: Vivid reddish orange
- B: Normalized to [0–255] (byte)

Persimmon is a color that resembles persimmons.

The first recorded use of persimmon as a color name in English was in 1922.

=== Princeton orange ===
Princeton orange

Color coordinates
- Hex triplet: #E77500
- sRGB^{B} (r, g, b): (231, 117, 0)
- HSV (h, s, v): (30°, 100%, 91%)
- CIELCh_{uv} (L, C, h): (61, 111, 31°)
- Source: Princeton University
- ISCC–NBS descriptor: Vivid orange
- B: Normalized to [0–255] (byte)

The first recorded use of Princeton orange as a color name in English was in 1928.

The color symbolizes Princeton University and is defined as Pantone 158. The equivalent RGB values vary among sources.

=== Pumpkin ===
Pumpkin
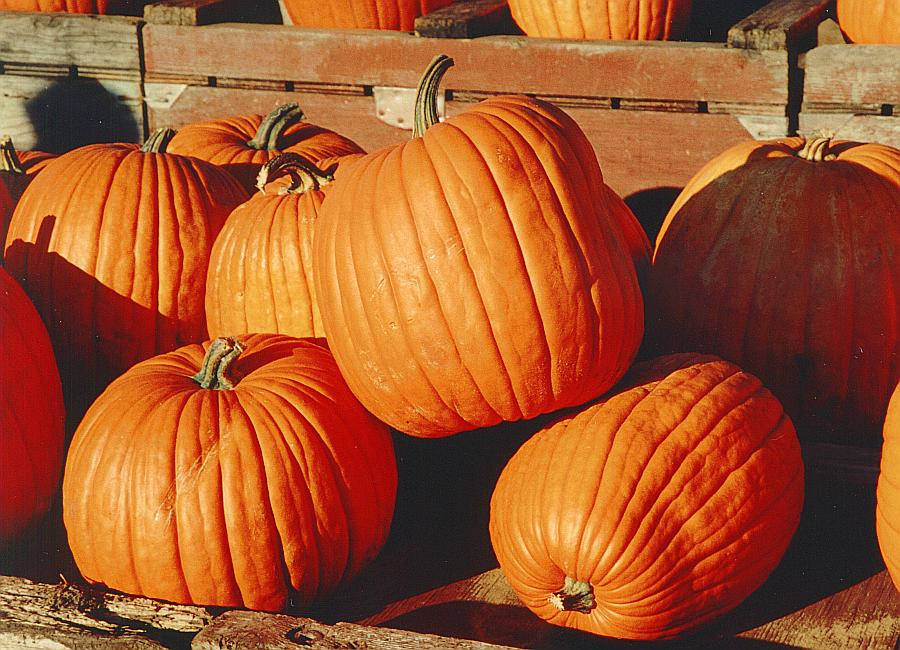
- The Cucurbita upon which the color "pumpkin" is based

Color coordinates
- Hex triplet: #FF7518
- sRGB^{B} (r, g, b): (255, 117, 24)
- HSV (h, s, v): (24°, 91%, 100%)
- CIELCh_{uv} (L, C, h): (65, 127, 26°)
- Source: Maerz and Paul
- ISCC–NBS descriptor: Vivid reddish orange
- B: Normalized to [0–255] (byte)

Pumpkin is a color that resembles pumpkins.

The first recorded use of pumpkin as a color name in English was in 1922.

Pumpkin or orange is used with black for Halloween decorations.

=== Saffron ===
Saffron
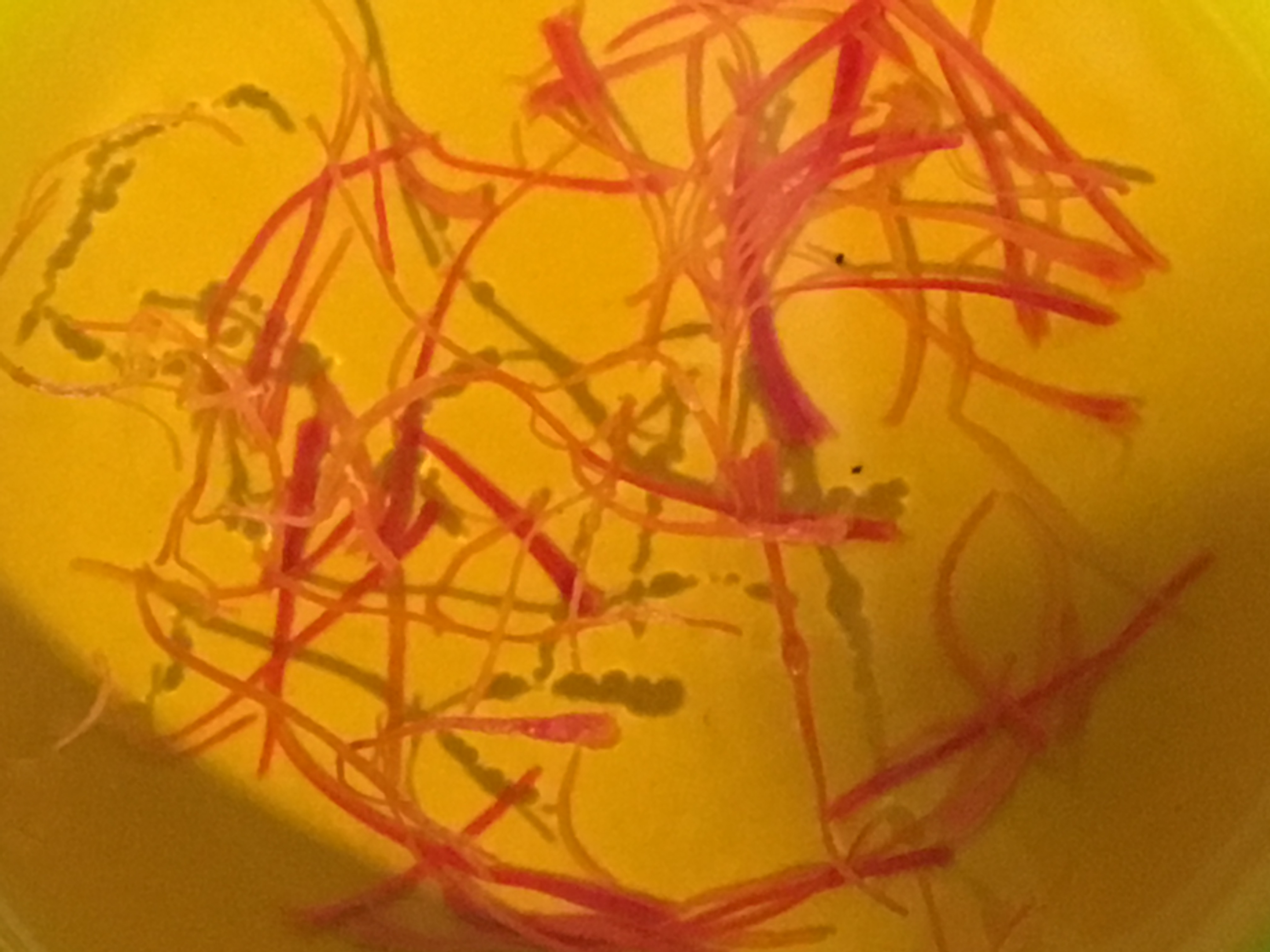
- Saffron fronds, derived from the saffron crocus, added to water

Color coordinates
- Hex triplet: #F4C430
- sRGB^{B} (r, g, b): (244, 196, 48)
- HSV (h, s, v): (45°, 80%, 96%)
- CIELCh_{uv} (L, C, h): (81, 90, 63°)
- Source: Maerz and Paul
- ISCC–NBS descriptor: Vivid yellow
- B: Normalized to [0–255] (byte)

The first recorded use of saffron as a color name in English was in 1200. It is considered as the most important colour in Hinduism. It is worn by the monks of the Theravada tradition.

=== Spanish orange ===
Orange (G&S)

Color coordinates
- Hex triplet: #E86100
- sRGB^{B} (r, g, b): (232, 97, 0)
- HSV (h, s, v): (25°, 100%, 91%)
- CIELCh_{uv} (L, C, h): (58, 123, 24°)
- Source: Gallego and Sanz
- ISCC–NBS descriptor: Vivid reddish orange
- B: Normalized to [0–255] (byte)

Spanish orange is the color that is called anaranjado (the Spanish word for the colour "orange") in the Guía de coloraciones (Guide to colorations) by Rosa Gallego and Juan Carlos Sanz, a color dictionary published in 2005 that is widely popular in the Hispanophone realm.

=== Tangelo ===
Tangelo

Color coordinates
- Hex triplet: #FF6000
- sRGB^{B} (r, g, b): (255, 96, 0)
- HSV (h, s, v): (23°, 100%, 100%)
- CIELCh_{uv} (L, C, h): (61, 142, 21°)
- B: Normalized to [0–255] (byte)

Tangelo is a shade of orange that is the color of the outer skin of the tangelo fruit.

=== Tangerine ===
Tangerine
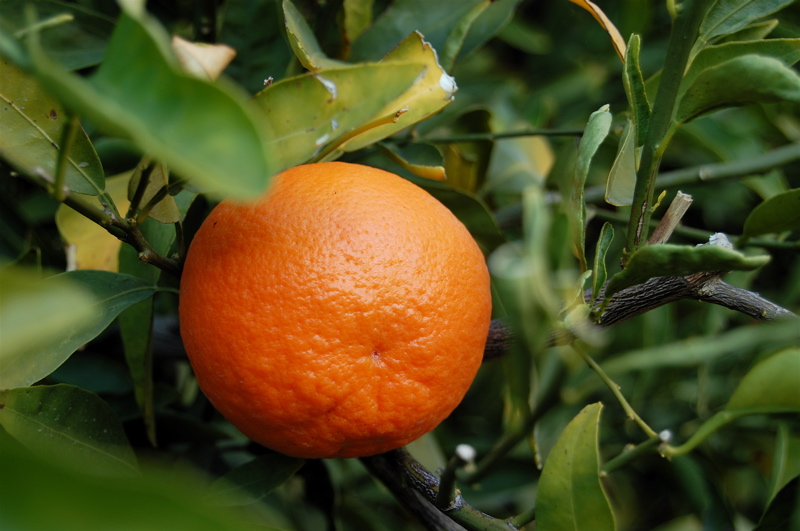
- Tangerine fruit in a tree

Color coordinates
- Hex triplet: #F28500
- sRGB^{B} (r, g, b): (242, 133, 0)
- HSV (h, s, v): (33°, 100%, 95%)
- CIELCh_{uv} (L, C, h): (66, 110, 34°)
- ISCC–NBS descriptor: Vivid orange
- B: Normalized to [0–255] (byte)

The first recorded use of tangerine as a color name in English was in 1899.

=== Tiger's eye ===
Tiger's Eye
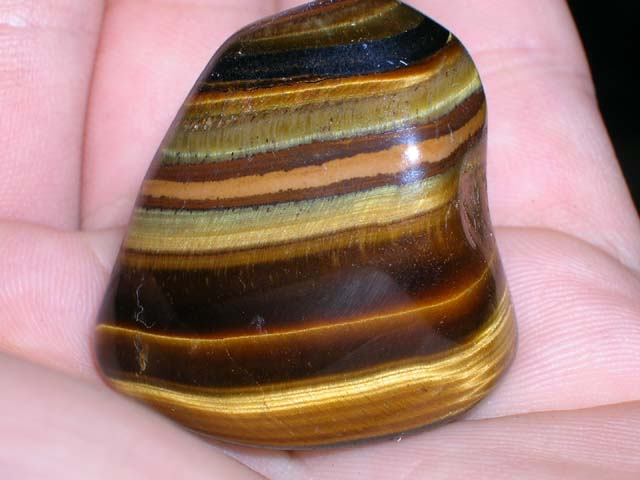
- Tiger's eye stone

Color coordinates
- Hex triplet: #B56917
- sRGB^{B} (r, g, b): (181, 105, 23)
- HSV (h, s, v): (31°, 87%, 71%)
- CIELCh_{uv} (L, C, h): (52, 78, 37°)
- Source: Crayola
- ISCC–NBS descriptor: Deep orange
- B: Normalized to [0–255] (byte)

The color tiger's eye is named for the tiger's eye gemstone, so named because its banding resembles the eye of a tiger. This color was formulated by Crayola in 1994 as part of the Gem Tones set.

=== UT orange ===
UT orange

Color coordinates
- Hex triplet: #FF8200
- sRGB^{B} (r, g, b): (255, 130, 0)
- HSV (h, s, v): (31°, 100%, 100%)
- CIELCh_{uv} (L, C, h): (67, 121, 31°)
- Source: University of Tennessee
- ISCC–NBS descriptor: Vivid orange
- B: Normalized to [0–255] (byte)

This shade of orange is unique to the University of Tennessee (UT), defined by the institution as Pantone 151, and is called UT orange. UT Orange is licensed and trademarked by the university for university/merchandise purposes. According to the university, this shade of orange is derived from the American daisy, which grew in profusion on the oldest part of the campus, The Hill. The University of Tennessee colors are UT orange and white, and are used across its various sports teams, advertising, and merchandise.

=== Xanthous ===
Xanthous

Color coordinates
- Hex triplet: #F1B42F
- sRGB^{B} (r, g, b): (241, 180, 47)
- HSV (h, s, v): (41°, 80%, 95%)
- CIELCh_{uv} (L, C, h): (77, 89, 56°)
- Source: icolorpalette.com
- ISCC–NBS descriptor: Vivid orange yellow
- B: Normalized to [0–255] (byte)

The name of the color xanthous is derived from xantho (meaning yellow or golden), from the Ancient Greek ξανθός and "ous" (meaning full of), from the Latin adjectival suffix -ōsus.

=== Xiaomi orange ===
Xiaomi orange

Color coordinates
- Hex triplet: #FD4900
- sRGB^{B} (r, g, b): (253, 73, 0)
- HSV (h, s, v): (17°, 100%, 99%)
- CIELCh_{uv} (L, C, h): (58, 154, 17°)
- Source: The Official Register of Color Names
- ISCC–NBS descriptor: Vivid reddish orange
- B: Normalized to [0–255] (byte)

Xiaomi orange is the shade of orange used for the Xiaomi Corporation.

== See also ==
- Lists of colors
