= LVK =

LVK or lvk may refer to:

- Landssamanslutninga av Vasskraftkommunar, a Norwegian interest group
- LIGO- Virgo- KAGRA network, a collaboration of gravitational waves laboratories
- LVK, the IATA code for Livermore Municipal Airport, California, United States
- lvk, the ISO 639-3 code for Lavukaleve language, Solomon Islands
