= Ingvald Godal =

Norwegian politician (1934–2019)

- Born: 26 October 1934; Aker Municipality, Norway
- Died: 28 January 2019 (aged 84)
- Education: Heriot-Watt University
- Occupations: Engineer and politician
- Relatives: Tord Godal (uncle) Johan Bojer (grandfather) Odd, Johan and Irja (children)
- Awards: Commander of the Order for Merits to Lithuania

Ingvald Godal (26 October 1934 – 28 January 2019) was a Norwegian politician for the Centre Party and later the Conservative Party. For the former party he was a State Secretary as well as mayor of Vinje Municipality; for the latter party he served four terms in the Norwegian Parliament. He was also involved in various organizations, most latterly the Norwegian Support Committee for Chechnya.

== Professional career ==
Born in Aker Municipality as the son of a vicar and a teacher, he took his secondary education at Hamar Cathedral School in 1953. He spent one year in the His Majesty The King's Guard before enrolling in higher education. In 1959 he graduated from the Heriot-Watt University as an engineer. During his time here, he had chaired the British chapter of the Alliance of Norwegian Students Abroad from 1957 to 1959.

From 1960 to 1965 he worked for the Ministry of Works in the Northern Region, at that time a federal division of Nigeria, and from 1965 to 1969 he worked for Norconsult in Uganda and other countries. From 1969 to 1970 he worked with civil relief during the Nigerian Civil War. He then spent one year in Asplan before settling in Vinje, Telemark to run a private business. Ultimately, from 1982 to 1985, he was chief administrative officer in Vinje municipality.

== Political career ==
A member of the Centre Party, he was appointed State Secretary in the Ministry of the Environment in 1972, when the cabinet Korvald assumed office. He lost this job when the cabinet Korvald fell following the 1973 election. However, he was elected mayor of Vinje Municipality in 1975, and served through one four-year term. He was then a member of the municipal council for three years, sitting in the executive committee. He had chaired the local party chapter in Oslo from 1969 to 1971, and chaired the regional chapter in Telemark from 1979 to 1981. During both these periods he was a member of the national board of the Centre Party.

Godal was elected to the Norwegian Parliament from Telemark in 1985, but had changed his allegiance to the Conservative Party. He was re-elected in 1989, 1993 and 1997, finally retiring ahead of the 2001 election. During the first term he was a member of the Standing Committee on Energy and Industry. In 1989 he changed to the Standing Committee on Defence, as well as serving one month as a member of the Enlarged Foreign Affairs Committee. During the last two terms he was a full member of both these committees.

Godal was previously involved in defence politics as vice president of the pro-military organization Norges Forsvarsforening from 1985 to 1987. He also chaired the regional chapter of the Norwegian Association of Local and Regional Authorities from 1975 to 1979, the nationwide hydropower interest group Nationwide Association of Hydropower Municipalities from 1977 to 1985, and the Norwegian Support Committee for Chechnya from 2002 to 2007 of which he was a board member.

He published several non-fiction books about different countries. His 2003 book Tsjetsjenia: der enkene blir selvmordsbombere (English: Chechnya: Where the Widows Become Suicide Bombers) included a preface written by Anna Politkovskaya.

Godal was decorated Commander of the Order for Merits to Lithuania in 2012.

In January 2015, he participated in the first Pegida march in Oslo, stating that Norway was "flooded" by Muslim immigrants.

He died on 28 January 2019 at the age of 84.

== Selected works ==
- ZAKI. Med kompass og stikkstenger syd for Sahara. 1965.
- Barna fra Santana: Nigeria under og etter borgerkrigen. 1971.
- Det blåser i grenseland. 1984.
- Jeg vil dø vakker, Litauen. 1993.
- Tsjetsjenia: Der enkene blir selvmordsbombere. 2003.
- Afrikansk rapsodi. 2007.
