= Andrew Piazza =

American basketball player

Personal information
- Born: c. 1954 Michigan, U.S.
- Listed height: 195 cm (6 ft 5 in)

Career information
- College: Central Michigan
- Position: Guard
- Number: 15

Career history

Playing
- 1977–1978: KR

Coaching
- 1977–1978: KR
- 1978–1984: Hemlock HS
- 1984–1987: Delta College
- 1987–1996: IPFW

Career highlights
- As player: Úrvalsdeild champion (1978)

Andrew Piazza (born c. 1954) is an American former basketball player and coach. He was one of the first influx of foreign professional players in Iceland during the 1970s, and in 1978 he led Knattspyrnufélag Reykjavíkur to the Icelandic championship. He was the head coach of the Indiana University – Purdue University Fort Wayne men's basketball team from 1987 to 1996, amassing 144 wins.

== Early life ==
Piazza was born in Michigan and attended Central Michigan University.

== Playing career ==
In 1977, Piazza signed with Icelandic powerhouse KR as a player-coach. On 20 October 1977, he scored 28 points in KR's largest-ever victory against arch-rivals ÍR in the pre-season Reykjavík Basketball Tournament. On 22 October, he scored 50 points against ÍS in the last game of the tournament, helping KR clinch the title for the second year in a row. He led all scorers during the tournament with 142 points in 5 games for an average of 28.4 points per game.

On 29 March 1978, he led KR to the national championship after scoring 20 points in the championship-clinching game. Piazza caused a minor controversy during the championship celebrations when he cut down the net from one of the baskets, a well-known custom in the United States but unheard of in Iceland, with Laugardalshöll officials threatening to bar the forthcoming Icelandic Cup finals game to take place on the court if KR would not reimburse them for the destroyed net. He finished 5th in the league in scoring during the season, with 325 points in 14 games for an average of 23.2 points per game.

== Later career ==
After retiring from playing, Piazza coached at Delta College and Indiana University – Purdue University Fort Wayne. He was inducted into the IPFW Athletics Hall of Fame in 2007.
