= Hudson Canyon =

Northwest Atlantic Ocean submarine canyon

Coordinates: 39.665°N 72.474°W

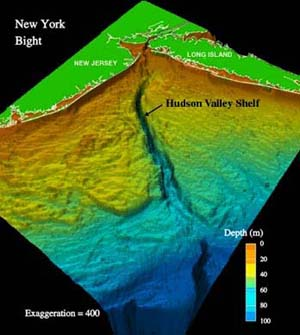
A false-color depiction of the Hudson Canyon on the continental margin off New York and New Jersey at the outlet of the Hudson River

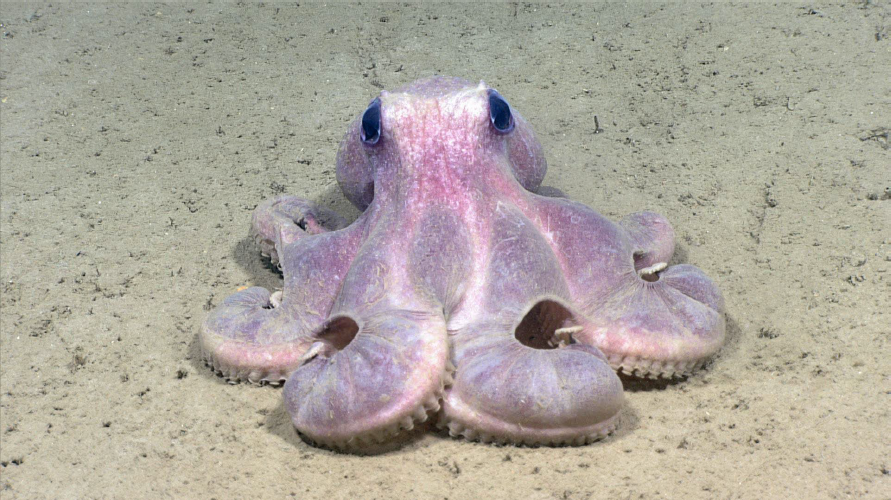
A deep-sea octopus on the seabed in Hudson Canyon.

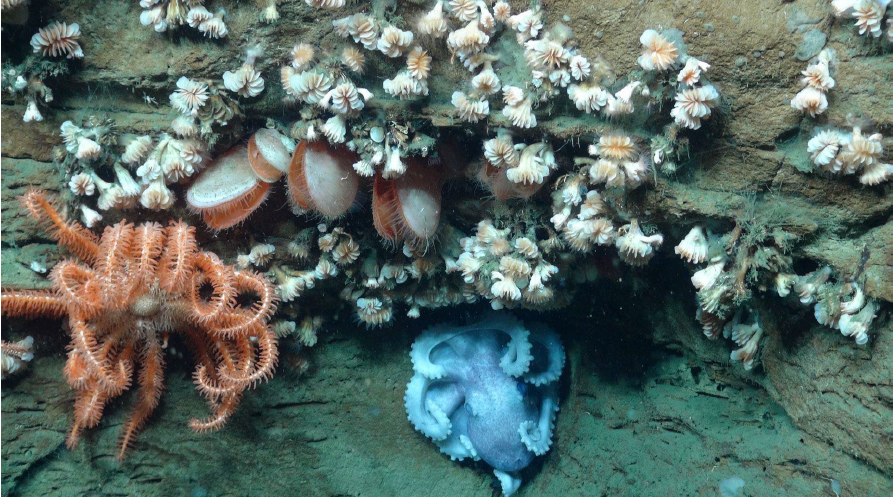
An octopus, starfish, bivalves, and cup corals on a ledge in the Hudson Canyon.

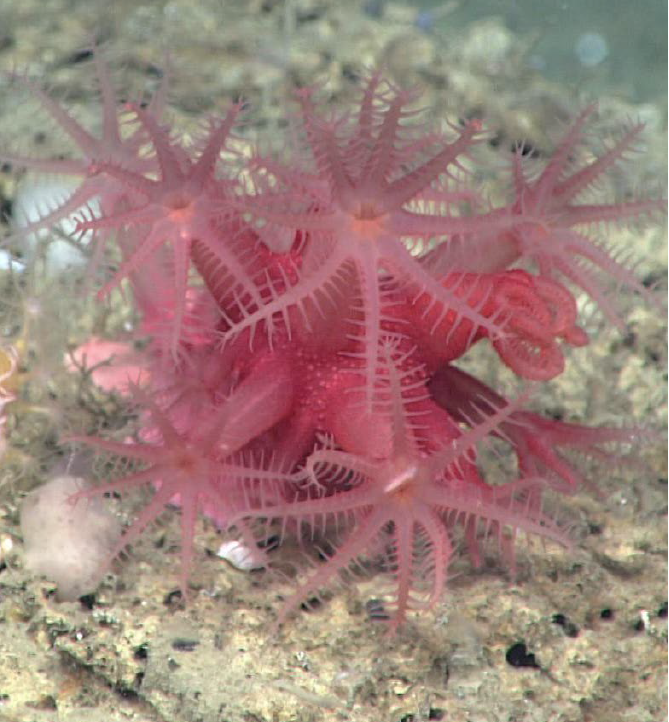
An octocoral (class Octocorallia) in the Hudson Canyon.

The Hudson Canyon is a submarine canyon that begins from the shallow outlet of the estuary at the mouth of the Hudson River, extending across the continental shelf beneath the Atlantic Ocean south and east of New York City, United States.

== Description ==
The Hudson Canyon extends out over 400 miles (640 km) seaward across the continental shelf, finally connecting to the deep ocean basin at a depth of 1.9–2.5 mi (3–4 km) below sea level. It begins as a natural channel several miles in width – starting as a 66–131-foot (20–40 m) depression at Hudson Channel southward from Ambrose Light, then carving through a deep notch of about 0.62 mi (1 km) depth in the shelf break, and running down the continental rise. Tidally associated flows of about 30 cm/s (1.1 km/h) up and down the deeper parts of the canyon have been recorded. As silt, sand and mud are carried down the Hudson River, they flow into the canyon and out into the deep sea.

The canyon is located near the 330-foot-long (100 m) isobath on the continental shelf and is 1.4 mi (2.2 km) deep at the base of the continental slope. Over a 50-mile (80 km) distance, the average slope of the canyon floor is 1.5°. At this point, the canyon is as much as 7.5 mi (12 km) wide (from east rim to west rim) and as much as 3,600 feet (1.1 km) deep from canyon rim to canyon floor across the continental slope. The floor of the Hudson Canyon is less than 1,600 feet (500 m) wide across the upper part of the slope and broadens to about 3,000 feet (900 m) at the base of the slope.

"Hudson Canyon" also designates a location marked by a navigational buoy indicating the seaward end of the vessel traffic separation scheme of the Hudson Canyon–Ambrose lanes which lead into and out of New York Harbor for Atlantic shipping.

== See also ==
- New York Bight
