= Børre Rønningen =

Norwegian politician (born 1949)

Børre Rønningen (born 11 May 1949 in Vikna Municipality) is a Norwegian politician for the Labour Party.

He previously represented the Socialist Left Party. For this party he was elected to the Norwegian Parliament from Telemark in 1989, and was re-elected on one occasion. He chaired the party chapter in Telemark from 1979 to 1983.

On the local level Rønningen was a member of Telemark county council from 1983 to 1991 and of the municipal council of Vinje Municipality from 1991 to 1995. After joining the Labour Party, he served as mayor from 1999 to 2003.

Outside politics he works with taxes. He has been active in Nei til EU, and leads the Nationwide Association of Hydropower Municipalities.
