= Þórir Þorbjarnarson =

Icelandic basketball player (born 1998)

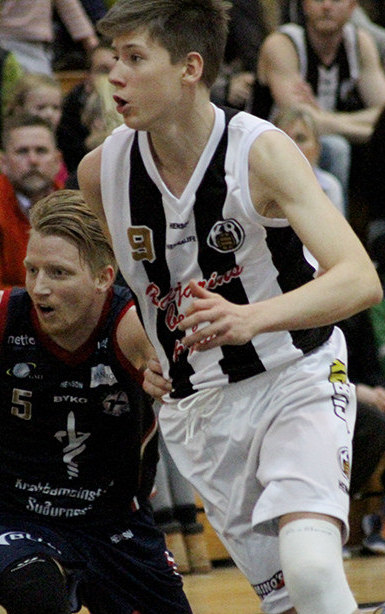
- Þórir with KR in 2015

No. 10 – KR
- Position: Shooting guard
- League: Úrvalsdeild karla

Personal information
- Born: 26 May 1998 (age 28) Akureyri, Iceland
- Listed height: 198 cm (6 ft 6 in)
- Listed weight: 91.5 kg (202 lb)

Career information
- College: Nebraska (2017–2021)
- Playing career: 2014–present

Career history
- 2014–2017; 2021: KR
- 2021–2022: Landstede Hammers
- 2022–2023: Oviedo CB
- 2023–2024: Tindastóll
- 2024–present: KR

Career highlights
- Úrvalsdeild Domestic Player of the Year (2026); 3x Úrvalsdeild Domestic All-First team (2024–2026); Úrvalsdeild Young Player of the Year (2017); 3× Icelandic champion (2015–2017); 2× Icelandic Basketball Cup (2016, 2017, 2026); Icelandic Basketball Supercup (2015); 2× Úrvalsdeild karla assist leader (2025, 2026)
Medals
Men's basketball
Representing Iceland
Games of the Small States of Europe
Bronze medal – third place	2017 San Marino	Team
Bronze medal – third place	2019 Montenegro	Team

Þórir Guðmundur Þorbjarnarson (born 26 May 1998) is an Icelandic professional basketball player for KR of the Úrvalsdeild karla. He played college basketball for the Nebraska Cornhuskers. Nicknamed "Tóti Túrbó", he has won the Icelandic championship three times and the Icelandic Basketball Cup twice.

== Career ==
=== Early career with KR (2014–2017) ===
Þórir came up through the junior ranks of KR and played his first senior game, at the age of 16, on 7 December 2014, when he scored 31 points against Haukar-b in the Icelandic Basketball Cup. During the 2015–2016 season he was named the best young player of the first half of the season. He developed into a key player for KR during its 2017 championship run, averaging 10.2 points, 2.6 rebounds and 1.9 assists per game, and was named the Úrvalsdeild Young Player of the Year after the 2016–17 season.

=== Nebraska (2017–2021) ===
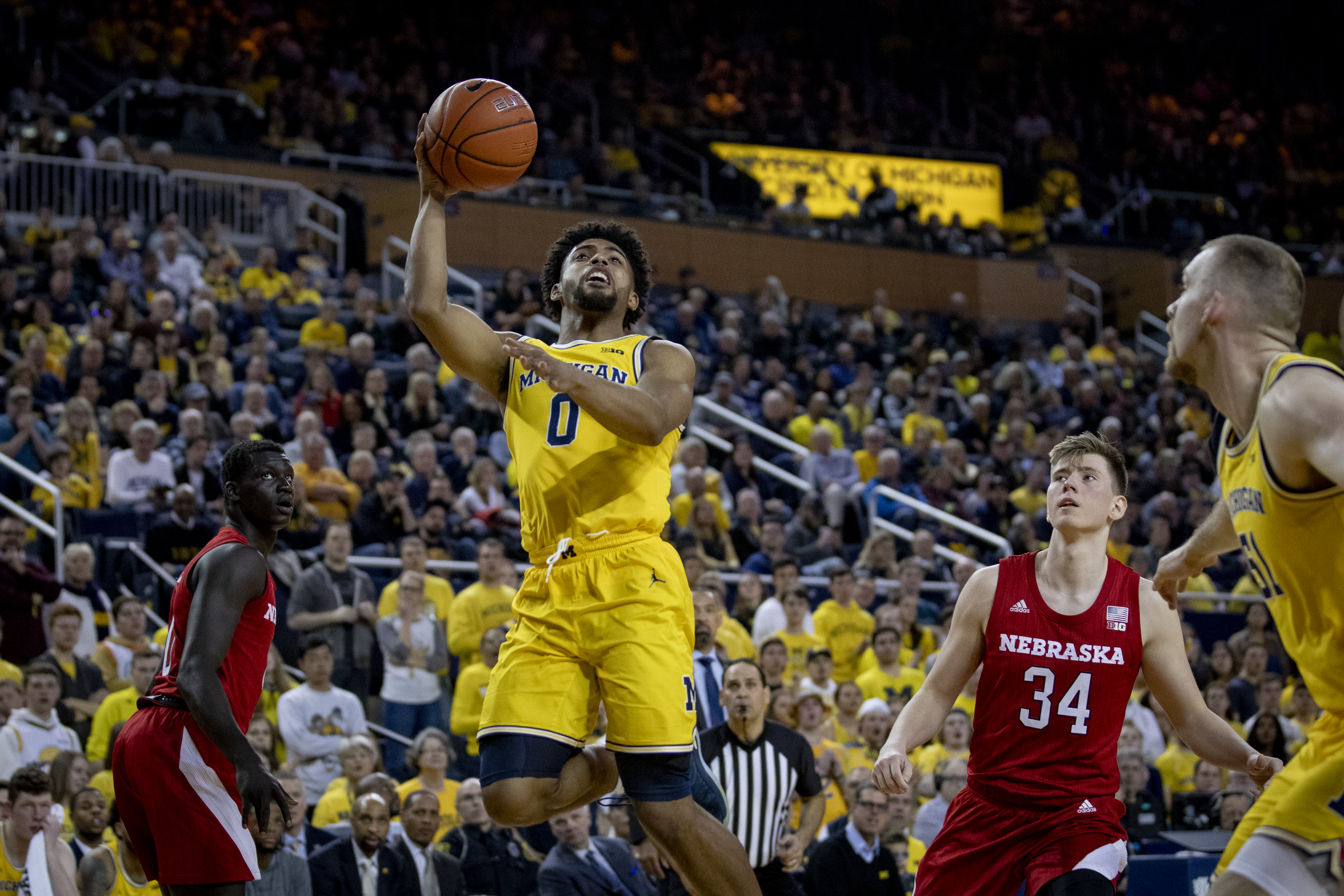
Þórir (#34) watching David DeJulius in March 2020

In August 2017 Þórir joined the University of Nebraska.

On 8 January 2020, he tied his career high with Nebraska after scoring 17 points in a 76–70 win against Iowa.

=== Return to KR (2021) ===
At the conclusion of his college career, Þórir rejoined KR in April 2021. He appeared in six regular seasons games, averaging 6.7 points, 4.0 rebounds and 3.0 assists, scoring a season high 18 points in a 96–85 victory against Stjarnan on 6 May. In the best-of-five first round of the playoffs, KR faced Reykjavík rivals Valur. In game five of the series, Þórir scored 15 points in the narrow 89–86 win. KR was eliminated semi-finals 0–3 against first seeded Keflavík. In the playoffs, Þórir averaged 8.3 points, 5.1 rebounds and 1.5 assists in 8 games.

He started the following season with KR. On 12 November he posted 28 points, 15 rebounds and 8 assists in an overtime victory against Stjarnan in the Úrvalsdeild. In 8 Úrvalsdeild games he averaged 15.9 points, 10.5 rebounds and 4.8 assists per game.

=== Landstede Hammers (2021–2022) ===
On 6 December 2021 Þórir signed with Landstede Hammers of the BNXT League. He made his debut on 8 December in an away game against Aris Leeuwarden.

=== Oviedo CB (2022–2023) ===
In August 2022, Þórir signed with Oviedo CB of the Spanish LEB Oro.

=== Tindastóll (2023–2024) ===
On 17 July 2023, Þórir returned to Iceland and signed with reigning national champions Tindastóll.

=== Return to KR (2024–present) ===
In August 2024, Þórir returned to KR on a 2-year contract. He led the Úrvalsdeild in assists per game for the 2024–2025 season.

In March 2026, he was named the Úrvalsdeild Domestic Player of the Year.

== National team career ==
In June 2016, Þórir helped Iceland's U-18 team win the Nordic championship and for his performance, he was named to the tournaments All-first team. Þórir was a member of Iceland's U-20 team that finished 8th at the 2017 FIBA Europe Under-20 Championship. He was selected for the senior national team for the first time prior to its games at the 2017 Games of the Small States of Europe in San Marino. He played five games during the tournament and helped Iceland finish third.

== Career statistics ==
Legend
GP	Games played	GS	Games started	MPG	Minutes per game
FG%	Field goal percentage	3P%	3-point field goal percentage	FT%	Free throw percentage
RPG	Rebounds per game	APG	Assists per game	SPG	Steals per game
BPG	Blocks per game	PPG	Points per game	**Bold**	Career high

=== College ===
Year	Team	GP	GS	MPG	FG%	3P%	FT%	RPG	APG	SPG	BPG	PPG
2017–18	Nebraska	9	0	2.1	.429	**.400**	–	.4	.3	.1	.0	.9
2018–19	Nebraska	25	7	12.2	.339	.174	.667	2.1	1.2	.6	**.2**	2.0
2019–20	Nebraska	**32**	**24**	**29.2**	**.452**	.372	**.780**	**4.8**	**1.3**	**1.1**	.1	**8.8**
2020–21	Nebraska	27	12	22.1	.342	.294	.769	3.1	1.7	.9	.1	3.9
Career		93	43	20.0	.405	.329	.758	3.1	1.3	.8	.1	4.8

== Awards, titles and accomplishments ==
=== Club career ===
==== Individual awards ====
- Úrvalsdeild Young Player of the Year: 2017

==== Titles ====
- Icelandic champion (3): 2015, 2016, 2017
- Icelandic Basketball Cup (2): 2016, 2017
- Icelandic Supercup: 2015
- Icelandic Company Cup: 2014

=== National team ===
==== Individual awards ====
- U-18 Nordic championships All-first team: 2016

==== Titles ====
- U-18 Nordic championships winner: 2016
