= Landssamanslutninga av Vasskraftkommunar =

Norwegian interest group

Landssamanslutninga av Vasskraftkommunar (LVK) is a Norwegian interest group. It groups municipalities that are involved in hydropower production.

Established in 1978, in 2004 it had a membership of 150 municipalities, accounting for 60% of the area of Norway, but only 16% of the population. Among the member municipalities, all counties are represented except for Oslo, Akershus and Vestfold. While Oslo is not a member of LVK, its headquarters are nonetheless located there.

The national leader is Børre Rønningen, the mayor of Vinje Municipality. Ingvald Godal, a former mayor of Vinje, chaired LVK from 1977 to 1985.

It maintains good ties with the Norwegian Association of Local and Regional Authorities (KS). It has faced the employers' organisation Norwegian Electricity Industry Association (EBL) as an opponent on many occasions, despite the fact that many of the companies that comprise the Electricity Industry Association are owned by LVK member municipalities.

It publishes the magazine LVK-nytt.

== See also ==
- List of micro-regional organizations
