= Þorvaldur Orri Árnason =

Icelandic basketball player

KR
- Position: Small forward
- League: Úrvalsdeild karla

Personal information
- Born: 17 June 2002 (age 24)
- Listed height: 198 cm (6 ft 6 in)

Career information
- Playing career: 2019–present

Career history
- 2019–2023: KR
- 2021: → Hamar
- 2023–2024: Njarðvík
- 2024–present: KR

Career highlights
- Icelandic Cup (2026); Icelandic Super Cup (2026); Úrvalsdeild Young Player of the Year (2022)

Þorvaldur Orri Árnason (born 17 June 2002) is an Icelandic basketball player who currently plays for KR of the Úrvalsdeild karla. In 2026, he won the Icelandic Cup with KR. He debuted for the Icelandic national team in 2022.

== Club career ==
Þorvaldur started his senior team career with reigning national champions KR during the 2019–2020 season.

During the second half of the 2020–2021 season, Þorvaldur was loaned to Hamar in the second tier 1. deild karla where he averaged 12.3 points and 4.4 rebounds in 8 games.

In 2021-2022, he averaged 11.7 points and 5.5 rebounds in 23 regular season and playoff games and was named the Úrvalsdeild Young Player of the Year.

During the 2022-2023 season, Þorvaldur averaged a career high 13.3 points along with 5.4 rebounds and 2.7 assists but was unable to prevent KR from being relegated to the second-tier 1. deild karla for the first time in its history.

In June 2023, Þorvaldur was selected by the Cleveland Charge with the 9th pick in the 2023 international G League draft. He was waived by the Charge in November the same year without appearing in a game. Shortly later, he returned to the Úrvalsdeild and signed with Njarðvík. Following the season, he returned to KR.

== National team career ==
In November 2022, Þorvaldur was selected to the Iceland men's national basketball team for the first time.
