= Meta Torvalds =

Finnish journalist

- Born: Elin Margareta Gyllenberg; 14 January 1922; Korsholm, Finland
- Died: 10 February 2012 (aged 90); Turku, Finland
- Occupation: Journalist
- Spouse: Ole Torvalds
- Children: 2
- Writing career
- Language: Swedish

Elin Margareta "Meta" Torvalds (née Gyllenberg; 14 January 1922–10 February 2012) was a Finnish journalist.

== Biography ==
Torvalds started as a journalist in 1946 at Österbottningen, and moved to Åbo Underrättelser in 1948. She worked at Åbo Underrättelser for almost 40 years, until 1985, and from 1971 to 1977, she was the editor-in-chief of the magazine. Torvalds was a member of the Evangelical Lutheran Church of Finland who often addressed ecclesiastical issues in her editorials, and was a strong advocate of the female priesthood. Torvalds was awarded the Church Communication Prize for her work as a journalist in 1983. She was also inaugurated as an honorary doctor of Åbo Akademi University in 2002.

Torvalds wrote the books Frisk Sydväst: med åboländsk ungdom genom 60 år (1957), Lämlar (1998), the 175-year history of Åbo Underrättelser, and Åboarna, hemstadsbok om det svenska Åbo (2002).

== Personal life and death ==
Torvalds had been married to writer Ole Torvalds from 1948 until his death. From this marriage, she had two daughters. Torvalds died in Turku after a brief illness on 10 February 2012.
