= Torvald =

Torvald is a Scandinavian masculine given name and may refer to:

- Torvald Appelroth (1902–1984), Finnish fencer
- Torvald Haavardstad (1893–1965), Norwegian politician
- Torvald Högström (1926–2010), Finnish racing cyclist
- Torvald Kvinlaug (1911–1997), Norwegian politician
- Torvald Tu (1893–1955), Norwegian poet, playwright, novelist and writer of humoresques

== Fictional characters ==
- Torvald Helmer, a fictional character in the play A Doll's House
- Commander Torvald, a fictional character from the Big Finish Doctor Who spin-off Gallifrey
- Torvald, a fictional character in the Nickelodeon cartoon Hey Arnold!
- Torvald Utne, a fictional character in the FX cartoon Archer
- Torvald, a Front Line champion in Paladins

== See also ==
- Thorvald
- Torvalds
