= Tordis =

Tordis is a given name. Notable people with the name include:

- Tordis Halvorsen (1884–1955), Norwegian actress
- Tordis Gjems Selmer (1886–1964), Norwegian singer
- Tordis Maurstad (1901–1997), Norwegian stage actress
- Tordis Ørjasæter (1927–2026), Norwegian literary critic, biographer, professor of educational science, and novelist
