= Norwegian Electricity Industry Association =

The Norwegian Electricity Industry Association (Norwegian: Energibedriftenes Landsforening) is an employers' organisation in Norway, organized under the national Confederation of Norwegian Enterprise.

The current CEO is Steinar Bysveen. Chairman of the board is Ola Mørkved Rinnan.
