= Norwegian Support Committee for Chechnya =

The Norwegian Support Committee for Chechnya (Norwegian: Den norske støttekomiteen for Tsjetsjenia) is a Norwegian advocacy group supportive of Chechen autonomy.

== Organization ==
Non-partisan, its purpose is to "work for immediate, total and unconditional withdrawal of all Russian military forces [from Chechnya] and for the right of the Chechen people to autonomy". In addition it works to spread information about the situation in Chechnya, to help organize developmental support within Chechnya, and to assist Chechen refugees in Norway and other countries.

Its board of directors are chaired by Hilde Jørgensen. Members of the board include former national legislator Ingvald Godal and the Norwegian PEN chairman Kjell Olaf Jensen.

== Attention ==
The committee has played a somewhat controversial role in Norwegian politics. Following the Moscow theater hostage crisis in October 2002, Ingvald Godal said of the terrorists that "I understand their action, even though I do not defend it". He later claimed that he failedly attempted to enlist Norway as a negotiator during the crisis. In November the same year, ahead of a state visit by Vladimir Putin in Norway, Ingvald Godal filed a prosecution request to the Police of Norway. He also suggested that the Prime Minister of Norway take initiative to an international criminal tribunal for Chechnya. The Norwegian Ministry of Foreign Affairs replied that a police prosecution of a foreign head of state is not possible, and rebuffed the latter proposal.

During Putin's visit, the committee held a demonstration together with Amnesty International, the Norwegian Helsinki Committee for Human Rights and Norwegian Church Aid. The committee has engaged in other peaceful protests, such as a 2007 memorial of Anna Politkovskaya in cooperation with the Helsinki Committee, the Norwegian PEN, the Human Rights House, the Norwegian Union of Journalists and Nobel Peace Center.

In 2004 the committee and the Socialist Left Party of Norway invited Ahmed Zakayev, a separatist exiled in the United Kingdom, to visit Norway. The Norwegian ambassador to Russia Øyvind Nordsletten received a letter from the Solicitor General of Russia, who called the visit "blasphemous" and demanded extradition. Another visit to Norway by Zakayev followed in December 2004. As a result, counsellor Paul G. Larsen at the Embassy of Norway in Moscow was summoned to the Russian Ministry of Foreign Affairs in what journalist Carsten Thomassen described as a "forceful diplomatic reaction".

== See also ==
- Norway–Russia relations
