= Ole Torvalds =

Swedish-speaking Finnish journalist and poet

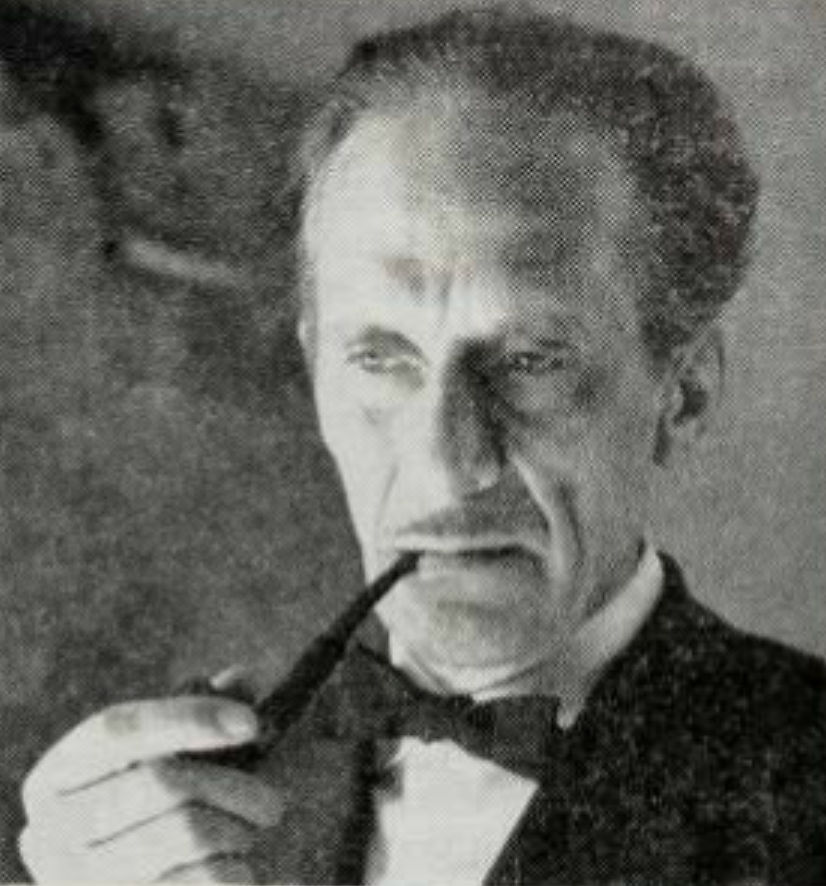
Ole Torvalds, before 1967

Ole Torvalds (4 August 1916 – 8 February 1995) was a Swedish-speaking Finnish journalist and poet. He was the father of journalist-politician Nils Torvalds and grandfather of software engineer Linus Torvalds.

His full name was Ole Torvald Elis Saxberg (his mother was Gerda Saxberg), but he was also named Karanko after his step father, Toivo Karanko. His family belongs to the Swedish-speaking minority. In 1935, after matriculating, he moved to Helsinki for studies at the University of Helsinki (until 1939) and changed his name to Torvalds. In 1944 he was awarded a literature prize from Svenska Dagbladet (shared with Harry Martinson, Lars Ahlin and Elly Jannes). He also received the State Prize for Literature in 1954, the Tollander Prize in 1955, and the Falcken Prize in 1974. In 1978 he received an honorary doctorate from Åbo Akademi.

His career as journalist was started as editor of Västra Nyland in Ekenäs, serving as editor from 1939 to 1941 and editor-in-chief from 1941 to 1945, where he stayed until after World War II. From 1946 to 1947, he was a member of the Ekenäs city council. He was also editor-in-chief of the journal Litteratur, Konst, Teater from 1945 to 1948.

He was married to Märta Natalia Fransiska von Wendt from 1940 until their divorce in 1948, and had three children with her. After a divorce he became editor of Österbottningen in Karleby for the period 1947–1948. Then he remarried with Elin Margareta Gyllenberg (Meta Torvalds) in 1948, fathered two more children and later became an editor (1948–1957) of Åbo Underrättelser, of which he was the chief editor from 1958 to 1967. He also served as vice chairman of the Turku authors' association, Turun kirjailijat-Åbo författare.

== Works ==
- "Vi sjunger inte för dem" (We don't sing for them), 1939
- "Ointagligt land", poems (Indomitable country), 1942
- "Hemligt medansvar" (Secret partial responsibility), poems, 1944
- "Svår glädje" (Difficult happiness), short stories, 1946
- Den rödgröna skorpionen (The red-green scorpion), with Jarl Bergbom and Tor Veckström, 1950
- "Strängar av aska" (Strings of ash), poems, 1954
- "Mellan is och eld" (Between ice and fire), poems, 1957
- "Vid källorna" (By the springs), 1961
- "Speglingar i en å" (Reflections in a river; subtitled Om sparbanken i Åbo i växelverkan med staden 1822–1972), 1972
- Nya blad i 150 värar. (En liten krönika om Äbo underrättelser 1824—1974) (A little chronicle of Åbo Underrättelser 1824-1974), 1974
- "Livstecken" (Signs of life), poems, 1986
- "Vågmärken" (Wave marks; literally Wave-formed ripple marks), poems about the archipelago 1937–1987, 1988

In addition, Ole Torvalds participated in compiling several cultural historical books and other works, and edited an edition of Z. Topelius's Tomtegubben i Åbo slott (The Elf in Åbo Castle) in 1967. He is one of the authors biographied by Project Runeberg.

== Translations ==
- Massan och du (The Crowd and You), Kurt Baschwitz
- Hangö fästning, Reino Aaltonen
- G. A. Serlachius oy 1868–1968. Ett familjeföretags öden (Swedish edition revised with Sargit Avellan)
- Ett sekel till havs, Effoas hundra första år 1883–1983, Paavo Haavikko
- De vandrande stövlarna (1945), later released as a revised edition titled Nio mans stövlar (1976), Pentti Haanpää
- Rubaiyat, Omar Khayyam
- Vandringsstaven (The Walking Staff), V. A. Koskenniemi
- Goethe-studier och andra litteraturhistoriska essäer (Goethe Studies and other literary-historical essays), V. A. Koskenniemi
- Sju kyrkor (Seven Churches), text by Mikko Ossa, photos by Reino Moilanen
- Åbo stads historia 1600–1721 (History of the City of Turku 1600-1721), Raimo Ranta
- Efter applåderna, Kosti Vehanen
- Sinuhe, egyptiern (The Egyptian), Mika Waltari (a translation with abridgements authorized by the author)
