= Cup coral =

Cup coral may refer to several different taxa of coral including:

- Balanophyllia bonaespei, a species in the family Dendrophylliidae
- Turbinaria, a genus in the family Dendrophylliidae
