= WCO =

WCO may refer to:

- Water Conservation Order
- Weak Crossover
- West Coast offense
- Wisconsin Chamber Orchestra
- World Council of Optometry
- World Customs Organization
- World Culture Open
