= Martin Pickering =

British cognitive psychologist

Martin Pickering FBA FRSE
- Born: Martin John Pickering; June 2, 1966 (age 60)
- Education: City of London School; Durham University (BA); University of Edinburgh (PhD)
- Scientific career
- Fields: Psycholinguistics
- Workplaces: University of Glasgow; University of Edinburgh
- Thesis: Processing dependencies (1991)
- Doctoral advisor: Elisabet Engdahl
- Doctoral students: Andrew J. Stewart
- Website: edwebprofiles.ed.ac.uk/profile/martin-pickering

Martin John Pickering (born 2 June 1966) is a British cognitive psychologist. He is Professor of the Psychology of Language and Communication at the University of Edinburgh.

== Early life and education ==
Pickering was educated at the City of London School and studied psychology at Durham University, graduating with a first-class Bachelor of Arts (BA) degree in 1987. He completed his PhD in Cognitive Science at the University of Edinburgh in 1991, having been supervised by Elisabet Engdahl.

== Career and research ==
After a period as a postdoc, he joined the University of Glasgow as a lecturer in 1995. He returned to Edinburgh as Reader in Psychology in 2000, and was promoted to Professor in 2003. He serves as the Director of Research for the School of Philosophy, Psychology and Language Sciences at the University of Edinburgh.

Pickering describes his main research interests within the psychology of language as language production, language comprehension, dialogue, language and imagination, joint action, and bilingualism.

He has served as editor of the Journal of Memory and Language and in 2023 was elected a Fellow of the British Academy (FBA). He was elected a Fellow of the Royal Society of Edinburgh (FRSE) in 2007. He was also the recipient of the Experimental Psychology Society Mid-Career Award. In April 2026, Aix-Marseille University awarded him an honorary doctorate in recognition of his contributions to psycholinguistics.

== Selected publications ==
=== Books ===
- Pickering, M. J.; Garrod, S. (2021). Understanding dialogue: Language use and social interaction. Cambridge: Cambridge University Press.

=== Journal articles ===
- Pickering, M. J.; Garrod, S. (2004). "Toward a mechanistic psychology of dialogue" (PDF). Behavioral and Brain Sciences. 27 (2): 169–225. doi:10.1017/S0140525X04000056.
- Hartsuiker, R. J.; Pickering, M. J.; Veltkamp, E. (2004). "Is syntax separate or shared between languages?" (PDF). Psychological Science. 15 (6): 409–414. doi:10.1111/j.0956-7976.2004.0069.
- Pickering, M. J.; Ferreira, V. S. (2008). "Structural priming: A critical review" (PDF). Psychological Bulletin. 134 (3): 427–459. doi:10.1037/0033-2909.134.3.427.
- Pickering, M. J.; Garrod, S. (2013). "An integrated theory of language production and comprehension" (PDF). Behavioral and Brain Sciences. 36 (4): 329–392. doi:10.1017/S0140525X12001495.
- Branigan, H. P.; Pickering, M. J. (2017). "An experimental approach to linguistic representation" (PDF). Behavioral and Brain Sciences. 40: e282. doi:10.1017/S0140525X16002028.
- Pickering, M. J.; Gambi, C. (2018). "Predicting while comprehending language: A theory and review" (PDF). Psychological Bulletin. 144 (10): 1002–1044. doi:10.1037/bul0000158.
