= Elisabet Engdahl =

Swedish linguist (born 1949)

- Born: Elisabet Britt Engdahl; 1949 (age 76–77)
- Scientific career
- Fields: Linguistics
- Workplaces: University of Gothenburg; Stanford University; University of Edinburgh
- Thesis: The Syntax and Semantics of Questions in Swedish
- Doctoral advisor: Barbara Partee
- Doctoral students: Martin Pickering; Sue Sentance
- Website: www.gu.se/en/about/find-staff/elisabetengdahl

Elisabet Britt Engdahl (born 1949 in Stockholm) is a Swedish linguist and professor emerita of Swedish at the University of Gothenburg. She was the first linguist to investigate parasitic gaps in detail.

== Education ==
After having completed an MA at Uppsala University, she was awarded a studentship from the Sweden-America Foundation and pursued graduate studies in general linguistics at the University of Massachusetts-Amherst. She received her PhD in 1980 for her dissertation on the Syntax and Semantics of Questions in Swedish, supervised by Barbara Partee.

== Career and research ==
She was a Sloan postdoctoral fellow in Cognitive Science at Stanford University, a research fellow at the Max-Planck-Institute for psycholinguistics at Nijmegen and at Lund University, and assistant professor at the University of Wisconsin–Madison. Between 1986 and 1995, she served as a reader at the Centre for Cognitive Science (now part of the School of Informatics) and the Human Communication Research Centre at the University of Edinburgh. In 1995, she took up a position at the University of Gothenburg and in 2004 she became professor of Swedish. She retired in 2014 and currently lives in Mölndal.

Engdahl has been a member of the Swedish Research Council since 2000, and she still serves as a member on the Council for Research Infrastructures. She is a member of the scientific board for CASTL (Center for Advanced Study in Theoretical Linguistics) at the University of Tromsø, and she is involved in the Scandinavian Dialect Syntax Network. The ScanDiaSyn network works on Scandinavian dialect syntax.

In 2008, she was elected to the Royal Swedish Academy of Letters, History and Antiquities, and in 2010, to the Royal Society of Arts and Sciences in Gothenburg. She received an honorary doctorate in 2012, awarded by Lund University.

Engdahl's main research interests are in the area of syntax and semantics, in particular in the Scandinavian languages. She is involved in the ScanDiaSyn network, which works on Scandinavian dialect syntax. Despite her retirement, Engdahl continues to research and publish, focusing on syntax, semantics, pragmatics, and information structure.

Her former doctoral students include Sue Sentance and Martin Pickering.

=== Publications ===
- The syntax and semantics of questions in Swedish, 1980
- Implicational universals : parametric variation in GB and GPSG, 1988
- Constituent questions : the syntax and semantics of questions with special reference to Swedish, 1985
- Argument roles and anaphora, 1990
- Interaktion och kontext : nio studier av svenska samtal, 2007
