= Crossover effects =

Restrictions on binding or coreference

In linguistics, crossover effects are restrictions on possible binding or coreference that hold between certain phrases and pronouns. Coreference (or coindexation) that is normal and natural when a pronoun follows its antecedent becomes impossible, or at best just marginally possible, when "crossover" is deemed to have occurred, e.g. ?Who_{1} do his_{1} friends admire ___{1}? The term itself refers to the traditional transformational analysis of sentences containing leftward movement (e.g. wh-movement, topicalization), whereby it appears as though the fronted constituent crosses over the expression (usually a pronoun) with which it is coindexed on its way to the front of the clause. Crossover effects are divided into strong crossover (SCO) and weak crossover (WCO). The phenomenon occurs in English and related languages, and it may be present in all natural languages that allow fronting.

== Examples ==
=== Wh-movement ===
The following sentences illustrate crossover phenomena related to wh-movement. The a-sentences are questions in which crossover has not occurred and are given here for the sake of comparison, and the b-sentences illustrate crossover - the intentional coreferential reading is unavailable per the leftward movement of the wh-expression. The subscripts mark coindexation (≈coreference); they indicate that the words bearing the subscripts are supposed to refer to the same one person. The gaps in the b-sentences mark the canonical position of the wh-expression (before movement):

a. Who_{1} said he_{1} was hungry? – Crossover absent, intentional coreferential reading available
b. *Who_{1} did he_{1} say ___{1} was hungry? – Crossover present (strong), intentional coreferential reading unavailable

a. Who_{1} did you say ___{1} likes his_{1} parents? – Crossover absent, intentional coreferential reading available
b. *Who_{1} did you say she_{1} likes ___{1}? – Crossover present (strong), intentional coreferential reading unavailable

a. Who_{1} will call his_{1} mother? – Crossover absent, coreferential reading available
b. ?Who_{1} will his_{1} mother call ___{1}? – Crossover present (weak), coreferential reading unlikely

a. Which student_{1} called her_{1} instructor? – Crossover absent, coreferential reading available
b. ?Which student_{1} did her_{1} instructor call ___{1} - Crossover present (weak), coreferential reading unlikely

The acceptability contrast here is curious upon first analysis. In both the a- and b-sentences, the order of the wh-expression and the coindexed pronoun is the same, the wh-expression preceding the pronoun. But only the reading indicated with the a-sentences is (fully) possible. The relevant difference is that in the b-sentences, the wh-expression appears to have been moved across the pronoun on its way to the front of the sentence, whereas there is no such crossover in the a-sentences.

=== Topicalization ===
The following illustrate crossover effects as a result of topicalization, as per Postal (1993). Postal suggests the idea of "scope islands" may play a role in the observance of crossover phenomena when operators are not the moving element. In the following examples, this effect is shown; the a) examples do not reveal crossover effects but the b) examples do. The crucial element that divides these essentially minimal pairs is the status of the pronoun, which is in the bracketed constituents below:

a. Sidney_{1}, I am sure [his_{1} job] is important to ____{1}. - no "scope island", intentional coreferential reading available

b. *Sidney_{1}, I am sure [your opinion of him_{1}] is important to ____{1}. - "scope island" restricts the scope to phrase internal, intentional coreferential reading unlikely

a. Ted_{1}, who_{1} I am sure that [his_{1} dismissal] has driven ____{1} mad, … - no "scope island", intentional coreferential reading available

b. *Ted_{1}, who_{1} I am sure that [your dismissal of him_{1}] has driven ____{1} mad, … - "scope island" restricts the scope to phrase internal, intentional coreferential reading unlikely

The observation to be made is that crossover effects also seem to arise when the pronoun being crossed over is embedded in a noun phrase and the item doing the movement is not an operator. The exact factors that play into this observation are under debate - see Comments. These examples belong to the weak crossover category, discussed in detail below.

== Strong and weak crossover ==
As just indicated by the examples, there are two types of crossover, strong and weak. The following two sections consider each of these types.

=== Strong crossover ===
Strong crossover occurs when the pronoun is in an argument position, i.e. it is an argument of the relevant verb. This means that it is not contained inside a noun phrase. Instances of strong crossover are clearly impossible, that is, the coreferential reading is strongly unavailable, e.g.

a. *Which politician_{1} did she_{1} say that they should vote for ___{1}? – Strong crossover, intentional coreferential reading impossible

b. *Who_{1} do you think he_{1} trusts ___{1}? – Strong crossover, intentional coreferential reading impossible

c. *Which man_{1} did he_{1} promise ___{1} would get a promotion? – Strong crossover, intentional coreferential reading impossible

While these sentences are actually grammatical, the reading indicated by the subscripts is robustly unavailable. For instance, the first sentence (sentence a) cannot be interpreted to mean that Susan told them to vote for herself (i.e. Susan). Most analyses account for strong crossover effects with Condition C effects of binding theory (see binding for more details). In the underlying structure (before movement) the antecedent (the pronoun) c-commands an R-expression (the wh-expression) which violates Condition C of binding theory and therefore could explain why a coreferential reading is unavailable in cases of strong crossover. As will be discussed below, the analyses of weak crossover are subject to more debate.

=== Weak crossover ===
Crossover is "weak" when the coreferential reading is marginal, that is, when the coreferential reading is not clearly unacceptable, but rather just quite unlikely. Typical cases of weak crossover occur when the expression that has been "crossed over" is a possessor inside a noun phrase, e.g.

a. ?Which players_{1} does their_{1} coach distrust ___{1}? – Weak crossover, indicated reading possible, but unlikely

b. ?Which beer_{1} does its_{1} brewer never advertise ___{1}? – Weak crossover, indicated reading possible, but unlikely

c. ?Who_{1} do her_{1} parents worship ___{1}? – Weak crossover, indicated reading possible, but unlikely

The pronoun that has been crossed over in each of these examples is embedded inside a noun phrase. Such cases of crossover are not impossible, but rather just unlikely. Since grammaticality judgments on instances of weak crossover are less robust than strong crossover, much of the literature on crossover effects focuses on weak crossover (see Lasnik & Stowell (1991), Postal (1993), Ruys (2000)) . Koopman & Sportiche (1983) attribute the judgements on coreference with respect to weak crossover to the Bijection Principle: “There is a bijective correspondence between variables and A-positions. (That is, each operator must A-bind exactly one variable, and each variable must be A-bound by exactly one operator.)” In the examples above, neither the trace (T), represented by the gap, nor the pronoun (P) binds the other as the pronoun is contained within a noun phrase. Therefore, the operator locally binds both T and P, meaning that it binds two variables and violates the Bijection Principle. However, weak crossover effects are absent when the pronoun is contained within an adjunct phrase, for example:

a.) Who_{1} did you say ___{1} was a liar before you met him_{1}? - Weak crossover absent, coreferential reading possible

Based on this observation, Stowell proposes the following analysis of weak crossover: “In a configuration where a quantifier Q locally binds a pronoun P and a trace T, P may not be contained in an argument phrase XP that c-commands T.”

=== Interaction of Weak Crossover with Other Phenomena ===
There are certain syntactic phenomena in which we would expect weak crossover effects to arise, however we find that they are absent and a coreferential reading is possible, e.g.

a.) Parasitic gaps

Who_{1} did Susan gossip about ___{1} despite his_{1} boss having vouched for ___{1}?

b.) Tough movement

Which girl_{1} will be easy to persuade her_{1} teacher to vouch for ___{1}?

These constructions indicate the complexity involved with respect to whether a coreferential reading is possible and why this is of interest to linguists. There are different possible analyses of why weak crossover effects do not arise in these constructions. One approach is to reanalyze the binding relations between pronouns and quantifiers in such constructions. Another approach is to revise the principles underlying weak crossover to account for why weak crossover effects do not occur in these environments.

== Comments ==
=== Mechanisms ===
Crossover is a particular manifestation of binding, which is one of the most explored and discussed areas of theoretical syntax. The factors that determine when the coreferential reading is possible have been extensively debated. Simple linear order plays a role, but the other key factor might be c-command as associated (primarily) with government and binding, or it might be o-command as associated with head-driven phrase structure grammar.

One such analysis (scope-theoretic) of the determining factors for a coreferential reading is outlined by Ruys (2000). Therein, crossover phenomena are said to occur when a previous binding/co-indexing relationship between (typically) an operator and a pronoun becomes unavailable after the fronting of a constituent. An operator must take scope over a pronoun in order to bind it; an operator must c-command the pronoun from an argument position (e.g. subject and object position for a verb) at some stage in the derivation in order to have scope over it, according to the theory of syntax adopted in this research. In essence, this requires that an operator c-commands the pronoun from an argument position in order to maintain a coreferential reading with said pronoun; as stated above, this is one side of an ongoing debate.

=== Universality ===
Crossover effects, while observed in the manner described in this article in English and related languages, are not exclusively observed in relation to raising or fronting. For example, Yoruba, a language of the Niger-Congo family, does not observe crossover effects in wh-movement examples like the ones given on this page; expressions such as those are completely grammatical to native speakers. Adesola (2006) describes a process by which Yoruba (and its related languages) avoids crossover effects in wh-movement via null operator raising. This research describes the presence of crossover phenomena elsewhere, however; the implication is that crossover effects may be universal, but are not observed in the same surface structures in all languages.

== See also ==
- Binding
- c-command
- Coreference
- Parasitic gap
- Syntactic movement
- Wh-movement
