= Parasitic gap =

Theoretical concept in generative grammar

In generative grammar, a parasitic gap is a construction in which one gap appears to be dependent on another gap. Thus, the one gap can appear only by virtue of the appearance of the other gap, hence the former is said to be "parasitic" on the latter. For example, in the example sentence in (1) the first gap is represented by an underscore ( __ ), and appears as a result of movement of the constituent which explanation to the beginning of the sentence. The second gap is represented by an underscore with a subscript p ( ___{p}); this is the "parasitic gap".

(1)	Which explanation did you reject __ without first really considering ___{p} ?

While parasitic gaps are present in English and some related Germanic languages, e.g. Swedish (see Engdahl 1983), their appearance is much more restricted in other, closely related languages, e.g. German and the Romance languages. Japanese linguistic scholar Fumikazu Niinuma has attempted to differentiate between parasitic gaps and coordination in his research, as he believes the two are often confused.

An aspect of parasitic gaps that makes them particularly mysterious is the fact they usually appear inside islands to extraction. Although the study of parasitic gaps began in the late 1970s, no consensus has yet been reached about the best analysis.

== The phenomenon ==
The example sentences in (2) are normal declarative sentences that contain no gap at all. The sentences in (3), in contrast, contain two gaps, whereby the second gap is parasitic on the first; the parasitic gap is marked with a p-subscript. The sentences in (4) show that if there is no real gap (that corresponds to the bold-faced constituent), then the parasitic gap is not possible.

(2)	no gap
	a.	You reviewed that book without actually reading it.
	b.	They played that song repeatedly despite not liking it.
	c.	You bought that old bike in order to fix it up.

(3)	parasitic gap possible with real gap
	a.	What book did you review __ without actually reading ___{p}?
	b.	Which song did they play __ repeatedly despite not liking ___{p}?
	c.	Which old bike did you buy __ in order to fix ___{p} up?

(4)	parasitic gap impossible without real gap
	a.	*You reviewed that book without actually reading ___{p}.
	b.	*They played that song repeatedly despite not liking ___{p}.
	c.	*You bought that old bike in order to fix ___{p} up.

The appearance of parasitic gaps in (3) appears to be reliant on syntactic movement (e.g. wh-movement or topicalization), and presents two challenges:

- The fact that there are two gaps but only one fronted wh-expression is a source of difficulty for the analysis of parasitic gap constructions. Why can one fronted wh-expression license two gaps?
- The fact that parasitic gaps usually appear inside extraction islands leads one to expect extraction from the site of the parasitic gap to be altogether impossible. Why do parasitic gaps ignore islands?.

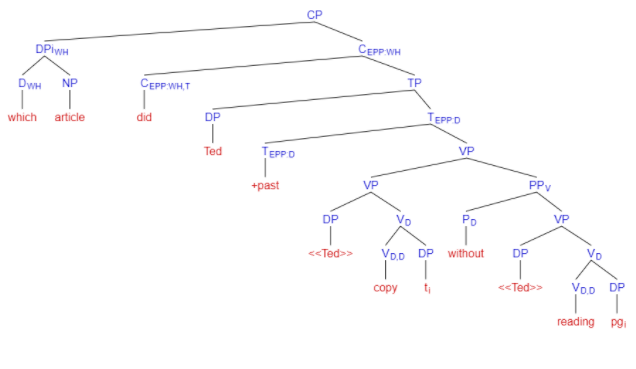
This is a syntax tree representing the example, parasitic gap phrase "Which article did Ted copy without reading?" example from Postal 's article Parasitic and Pseudoparasitic Gaps. Parasitic gap is represented with "pg" and the real gap with "t".

== History ==
=== Discovery ===
The phenomenon of parasitic gaps appears to have been discovered by John Robert Ross in the 1960s, but remained undiscussed until papers by Knut Tarald Taraldsen and Elisabet Engdahl explored the properties of the phenomenon in detail. The analysis of parasitic gaps was central to the development of the GPSG framework (Generalized Phrase Structure Grammar) in the mid-1980s, and this analysis was later refined in the HPSG framework (Head-driven Phrase Structure Grammar) of Carl Pollard and Ivan Sag. In the 1990s, a debate centered around the best theoretical analysis of parasitic gaps, namely extraction versus percolation. This debate culminated in a collection of essays edited by Peter Culicover and Paul Postal in 2001.

=== Controversy ===
==== Extraction gap versus proform ====
The theoretical analysis of parasitic gaps is not a settled matter by any means, since accounts of the phenomenon vary drastically. In very broad terms, there are two lines of analysis that one can pursue:

- The extraction analysis assumes that parasitic gaps are extraction gaps, and that parasitic gaps arise by way of the same basic mechanism that licenses "normal" extraction gaps. This sort of approach must augment the analysis of extraction gaps in some way in order to accommodate parasitic gaps under the same theoretical umbrella. Extraction analyses have the advantage that they immediately accommodate the simple observation that most parasitic gaps appear to be dependent on the occurrence of wh-movement or topicalization. Extraction analyses are challenged, however, by missing-object constructions, as noted above.
- The proform analysis assumes that parasitic gaps actually contain a covert element, this element having the status of definite proform. Proform analyses have the advantage that they immediately accommodate the simple observation that many parasitic gaps occur optionally; the covert proform has the option to be overt. Proform analyses are challenged, however, by the fact that most parasitic gaps occur in the immediate environment of wh-movement or topicalization, since they do not provide a clear basis for explaining this correlation.

Some analyses mix and match these two basic lines of analysis, although in general, both are well represented in the literature on parasitism and most accounts can be placed in the one or the other camp.

==== Licensing of real gap ====
The controversy regarding the licensing of parasitic gaps has also been widely debated as the phenomenon has continued to be researched. It is generally agreed upon that a real gap licenses a parasitic gap however, the required properties of this real gap have been widely debated. In 1994, Postal wrote a paper examining how the leftward extraction of clauses may be a general licensor for parasitic gaps while examining two theoretical approaches:

- P-Gap Licensing Restriction (PLR) suggests that the gaps that license parasitic gaps must be restricted in some way.
- PG=NP suggests that the licensors of parasitic gaps must be NPs/DPs.

On the basis of evidence from topicalization and object raising, Postal's 1994 paper concludes that true parasitic gaps are not licensed by rightward DP movement, but rather by leftward extraction of a clause. Overfelt 2016 argues against Postal's claim that rightward DP movement cannot license true parasitic gaps, and concludes that the licensors of true parasitic gaps are adjunction structures.

== Some traits of parasitic gaps ==
Some of the central research issues that arise in the investigation of parasitic gaps include:

- optionality: many parasitic gaps are optional
- obligatoriness: some parasitic gaps are obligatory
- missing object: the appearance of parasitic gaps in missing object constructions (also known as tough-movement)
- parallelism: syntactic parallelism seems to promote the appearance of parasitic gaps

=== Often optional ===
Many parasitic gaps appear optionally. They are in non-complementary distribution with a pronoun, meaning that the speaker has the choice whether to employ the gap or not. The example sentences in (5) contain typical parasitic gaps, whereas the ones in (6) use a pronoun instead of the gap. In other words, in these contexts, the parasitic gap is optional. Optionality like this suggests an analysis of parasitism in terms of ellipsis, since optionality is the primary trait of known ellipsis mechanisms.

(5)	parasitic gap present
	a.	Which dish did you order __ after you tried ___{p}?
	b.	Which movie will they like __ as soon as they see ___{p}?

(6)	parasitic gap absent
	a.	Which dish did you order __ after you tried it?
	b.	Which movie will they like __ as soon as they see it?

=== Sometimes obligatory ===
While many parasitic gaps occur optionally, other parasitic gaps occur obligatorily; this can be seen when the parasitic gap precedes the "real" gap. The example sentences in (7) are normal declarative sentences that contain no gap at all. The sentences in (8), in contrast, contain two gaps, with the parasitic gap preceding the real gap. We know that the first gap (the leftmost gap) in (8) is parasitic on the following gap because it, i.e. the leftmost gap, appears inside what is normally an extraction island (marked with square brackets). As for the sentences in (9) — which are strongly marginal (indicated by the double question mark notation ??) — they show that in a sense, the real gap can also be dependent on the parasitic gap. This aspect of parasitic gaps is related to weak crossover (WCO). WCO occurs when a fronted expression is coreferential with an intermediate expression that appears between the fronted expression and the position of its gap.

(7)	no gap
	a.	The rumor about the girl annoyed her.
	b.	If you get to know him, you will like Bill.

(8)	parasitic gap precedes real gap
	a.	Which girl did [the rumor about ___{p}] annoy __?
	b.	Bill is the type of guy who [if you get to know ___{p}], you will like __.

(9)	real gap marginal if parasitic gap absent; weak crossover violation
	a.	??Which girl did the rumor about her annoy __?
	b.	??Bill is the type of guy who if you get to know him, you will like __.

In the big picture, one can simply note that parasitic gaps behave variably depending upon whether they precede or follow the "real" gap. When they precede the "real" gap, their appearance is usually obligatory.

=== Missing object ===
Much work on parasitism assumes that parasitic gaps are dependent on the existence of another gap. The assumption is that parasitic gaps are reliant on the mechanisms that license normal extraction gaps such as wh-movement and topicalization. This assumption is challenged, however, by so-called missing-object constructions, also known as tough-constructions or tough-movement. The example sentences in (10) lack gaps entirely. The sentences in (11) contain parasitic gaps despite the fact that neither wh-movement nor topicalization has occurred. These sentences illustrate a missing-object construction, since the verbs appreciate, understand, and get are transitive and should hence take an object. This object is missing, as marked by the gap on the left. Whatever the analysis of parasitic gaps ends up being in the long run, it will have to accommodate the facts involving missing objects illustrated here. Movement (wh-movement, topicalization) may not actually be the key factor licensing parasitic gaps.

(10)	no gap
	a.	It is easy to appreciate her after getting to know her.
	b.	It is hard to understand this essay without reading it several times.
	c.	It will be tough to get the motor running without entirely rebuilding it.

(11)	parasitic gap despite lack of wh-fronting or topicalization
	a.	She is easy to appreciate __ after getting to know ___{p}.
	b.	This essay is hard to understand __ without reading ___{p} several times.
	c.	The motor will be tough to get __ running without entirely rebuilding ___{p}.

=== Show structural parallelism ===
Examining the examples of optional parasitic gaps produced above so far, one sees that in each case, a certain structural parallelism is present, where both the real gap and the parasitic gap bear the grammatical function of direct object. This parallelism is now explicitly illustrated using brackets. In each of these examples, the square brackets mark what appear to be parallel structures, similar to the type of coordinate structure found coordination. The brackets mark verb phrases (VPs), and the subordinator appearing between the brackets is functioning like a coordinator (i.e. and, or, or but). This parallelism may be a significant factor that is aiding the appearance of the parasitic gaps.

(12)	structural parallelism:				OBJECT			OBJECT
	a.	Which manuscript	did you	[_{VP} resubmit	__ ]	after	[_{VP} revising	___{p} ]	?
	b.	Which report	did you	[_{VP} file	__ ]	without	[_{VP} reading	___{p} ]	?
	c.	Which old bike	did he	[_{VP} buy	__ ]	in order to	[_{VP} fix up	___{p} ]	?
	d.	Which foods	does he	[_{VP} fantasize about	__ ]	without	[_{VP} ever eating	___{p} ]	?
	e.	Which girl	did you	[_{VP} ask out	__ ]	before	[_{VP} meeting	___{p ]}	in person?

When the real gap and the parasitic gap are not structurally parallel — as when the real gap bears the grammatical function of subject, while the parasitic gap bears the grammatical function of object — there is a significant drop in acceptability of the parasitic gap. The examples in (13) show that, in such contexts, parasitic gaps are all marginal to varying degrees.

(13)	structural non-parallelism:			SUBJECT				OBJECT
	a.	?	Who	[_{XP} __	secretly supports John ]	without	[_{XP} John secretly supporting	___{p}	back ]?
	b.	?	Which girl	[_{XP} __	likes Billy ]	without	[_{XP} Billy liking	___{p}	back ]?
	c.	?	Which spy	[_{XP} __	escaped ]	without	[_{XP} anyone first identifying	___{p}	]?
	d.	??	Which explanation	[_{XP} __	had to be repeated ]	for	[_{XP us to finally get}	___{p}	]?
	e.	??	Which report	[_{XP} __	was filed ]	without	[_{XP any of us first reading}	___{p}	]?

The marginality of the examples in (13) correlates with the lack of syntactic parallelism. What exactly explains this drop in acceptability is not entirely clear, although it may have to do with ease of processing. Parallel structures are easier for humans to process, and hence parasitic gaps are facilitated by contexts that have a low processing load.

== See also ==
- Coordination
- Crossover
- Ellipsis
- Syntactic movement
- Topicalization
- Tough movement
- Verb phrase
- Wh-movement
