= Sue Sentance =

British computer scientist and educator

Sue Sentance OBE
- Born: Susan Sentance
- Education: University of Edinburgh (MSc, PhD)
- Awards: BCS Lovelace Medal (2024); Suffrage Science award (2020)
- Scientific career
- Fields: Computer science education
- Workplaces: Raspberry Pi Foundation; University of Cambridge; National Centre for Computing Education; King's College London; Anglia Ruskin University
- Thesis: Recognising and responding to English article usage errors : an ICALL based approach (1993)
- Doctoral advisor: Elisabet Engdahl; Helen Pain
- Website: suesentance.net

Susan Elizabeth Sentance OBE is a British computer scientist, educator and director of the Raspberry Pi Computing Education Research Centre, a joint initiative between the Raspberry Pi Foundation and the University of Cambridge. Her research investigates a wide range of issues computer science education, teacher education and the professional development of those teaching computing. In 2020 Sentance was awarded a Suffrage Science award for her work on computing education.

== Early life and education ==
Sentance studied artificial intelligence (AI) and information technology (IT) at the University of Edinburgh where she was awarded a Master of Science degree in 1989 followed by a PhD in 1993 investigating intelligent computer-assisted language learning (ICALL) supervised by Helen Pain and Elisabet Engdahl.

== Career and research ==
In 2014 Sentance joined King's College London as a lecturer in computing education. Sentance served on the Royal Society computing education advisory group in 2016, with whom she investigated computer science education in the United Kingdom. Sentance was involved with the evaluation of .NET Gadgeteer and the Micro Bit.

Sentance joined the Raspberry Pi Foundation in 2018 as Chief Learning Officer where she oversees a gender disparity in computing program that seeks to improve the representation of girls in computer science classes. She has served on the board of Computing at School (CAS). Her research has been funded by the Engineering and Physical Sciences Research Council (EPSRC) and Microsoft. She collaborates with the National Centre for Computing Education (NCCE) and joined the Department of Computer Science and Technology, University of Cambridge in 2021.

With Erik Barendsen and Carsten Schulte, she edited the book Computer Science Education: Perspectives on Teaching and Learning in School.

=== Awards and honours ===
- 2017: British Educational Research Association (BERA) public engagement and impact award
- 2020: Suffrage Science award for her work on computing education.
- 2024: BCS Lovelace Medal for her exceptional contributions and research in computing education.
