= Tough movement =

Type of syntactic movement

In formal syntax, tough movement refers to sentences in which the syntactic subject of the main verb is logically the object of an embedded non-finite verb. Because the object of the lower verb is absent, such sentences are also sometimes called "missing object constructions". The term tough movement reflects the fact that the prototypical example sentences in English involve the word tough.

== Examples ==
=== English ===
In (1) and (2), the (a) examples illustrate tough movement in English. In (1a) this problem is logically the object of solve, and (1a) can be paraphrased as (1b) or (1c). In (2a) Chris is logically the object of please, and (2a) can be paraphrased as (2b) or (2c).

(1) a.  This problem is tough to solve. 
    b.  It is tough to solve this problem
    c.  To solve this problem is tough.

(2) a.  Chris is easy to please. 
    b.  It is easy to please Chris.
    c.  To please Chris is easy.

Adjectives that allow this type of construction include:

- list of English raising adjectives: amusing, annoying, awkward, bad, beautiful, beneficial, boring, comfortable, confusing, convenient, cumbersome, dangerous, delightful, depressing, desirable, difficult, dull, easy, educational, embarrassing, essential, excellent, exhausting, expensive, fashionable, fine, fun, good, great, hard, horrible, ideal, illegal, important, impossible, impressive, instructive, interesting, irritating, loathsome, necessary, nice, odd, painful, pleasant, pleasurable, rare, risky, safe, simple, strange, tedious, terrible, tiresome, tough, tricky, unpleasant, useful, weird

This type of movement also occurs with noun phrases like a delight, a pleasure, a breeze, or a cinch, as well as with the complex verb take a long time:

(3) a.  Nureyev is a delight to watch. 
    b.  It is a delight to watch Nureyev.
    c.  To watch Nureyev is a delight

(4) a.  This document will take a long time to process. 
    b.  It will take a long time to process this document.
    c.  To process this document will take a long time.

=== Dutch ===
Tough movement occurs in Dutch, as in (5a), which can be rephrased without tough movement as in (5b): :

{Dit boek} is moeilijk {[ ____ ]} te verkrijgen.
{this book} is difficult {} to get
'This book is difficult to get.'

Het is moeilijk {[ dit boek ]} te verkrijgen.
it is difficult {this book} to get
'It is difficult to get this book.'

As observed by van der Auwera and Noël (2011), Dutch appears to have a much more limited range of predicates which trigger tough movement than English does:

- list of Dutch raising adjectives: (ge)makkelijk, simpel, eenvoudig, moeilijk, lastig, interessant, leuk, goed, fijn, geweldig, prima, uitstekend, aangenaam, essentieel, veilig, nuttig, prettig, plezierig, instructief, leerzaam, aardig, nood-zakelijk, belangrijk, onmogelijk, pijnlijk, vervelend, saai, irritant, duur, gevaarlijk, link, deprimerend, vreemd, raar

Unlike English, Dutch raising predicates do not include noun phrases.

=== Spanish ===
Tough movement occurs in Spanish, as in (6a) and (7a). Equivalent sentences without tough movement also occur, as in (6b) and (7b).

El libro es fácil de leer.
'The book is easy to read.'

Es fácil leer el libro.
{'It is} easy {to read} the book.'

El problema es imposible de resolver.
'The problem is impossible to solve.'

Es imposible resolver el problema.
{'It is} impossible {to solve} the problem'.

The class of words that can trigger tough-movement in Spanish is smaller than in English; in Spanish only adjectives can do so, not noun phrases like in English. According to Sauer (1972), Spanish tough-movement adjectives must in general express some degree of difficulty. However, in certain dialects adjectives like interesante 'interesting' also participate in tough-movement: thus, the sentence in (8) was accepted as grammatical by 7 out of 16 native Spanish speakers:

? Esa película es interesante de ver.
{} 'That film is interesting to see.'

Reider (1993) conducted a survey where 16 native speakers of Spanish (eight European and eight Latin American) answered whether they thought 27 sentences showing tough movement with different adjectives were grammatical, and found that Latin American Spanish speakers tended to accept tough movement with more adjectives, but there was considerable variability between speakers; no two speakers had the exact same response for all 27 sentences. This led Reider to propose that rather than a semantic reason for why certain adjectives can trigger tough movement and others cannot, instead it may be encoded separately for each word in a speaker's mental lexicon.

=== Japanese ===
Example of a tough construction in Japanese is given in (9a).

ケーキ-が この ナイフ-で 切り-やすい。
keeki-ga kono naifu-de kiri-yasui
cake-NOM this knife-INS {cut-easy to}
'The cake is easy to cut with this knife.'

この ナイフ-で ケーキ-が 切り-やすい。
kono naifu-de keeki-ga kiri-yasui
This knife-INS cake-NOM {cut-easy to}
'With this knife the cake is easy to cut.'

==== Inoue's 1978 classification ====
Tough constructions in Japanese are formed by combining verb stems such as 'yomi' to read, and one of the adjectives 'yasui' meaning easy to, or 'nikui' meaning difficult to, resulting in a form like 'yomiyasui' easy to read, or 'yominikui' difficult to read. According to Inoue there are 4 types of tough constructions in Japanese simply labelled as Type I, Type II, Type III and Type IV an example of each of these is shown below. Inoue remarked that the difference between these types depended on the verb and broadly categorized Types I and II as containing verbs where the action is controlled by the agent of the sentence, and the verbs in Types III and IV as containing verbs where the action is not controlled by the agent.

この 本-が ジョン-に 読み-やすい。
Kono hon-ga Jon-ni yomi-yasui.
This book-NOM John-DAT {read-easy to}
"This book is easy for John to read."

最近 ジョン-は とても 寝付き-にくい。
Saikin Jon-wa totemo netsuki-nikui.
Recently John-TOP very {sleep-difficult to}
"Recently John has had a lot of difficulty getting to sleep."

木綿もの-が 乾き-やすい。
Momenmono-ga kawaki-yasui.
{Cotton textile-NOM} {dry-easy to}
"Cotton textiles dry easily."

エリート-が つよい 挫折感-を 味わい-やすい。
Eriito-ga tsuyoi zasetsukan-o ajiwai-yasui.
Elites-NOM strong frustration-ACC {feel-easy to}
"Elites easily feel a strong sense of frustration."

==== Ohkado's 1993 classification ====
In a 1993 doctoral thesis Ohkado proposed that Japanese has three types of tough constructions, according to whether the sentence begins with a Theme argument, a Location argument, or a Goal argument . An example of each of these types of constructions can be seen below:

この 本-が 太郎-にとって 図書館-で 読み-やすい。
Kono hon-ga Taroo-nitotte toshokan-de yomi-yasui
This book-NOM Taroo-for library-LOC {read-easy to}
"This book is easy for Taroo to read at the library."

この 図書館-が 太郎-にとって 本-を 読み-やすい。
Kono toshokan-ga Taroo-nittote hon-o yomi-yasui
This library-NOM Taroo-for book-ACC {read-easy to}
"At this library, it is easy for Taroo to read the book."

花子-が 太郎-にとって 本-を 貸し-やすい。
Hanako-ga Taroo-nittote hon-o kashi-yasui
Hanako-NOM Taroo-for book-ACC {lend-easy to}
"To Hanako, it is easy for Taroo to lend a book."

Ohkado suggested that the theme construction is a result of NP movement, while the location and goal constructions are a result of wh-movement. This suggests that while both location and goal constructions contain a wh-island, the theme construction does not and therefore allows for clause internal scrambling.

== Analyses ==
Noam Chomsky noted the existence of such constructions (though not by name) in Current Issues in Linguistic Theory (1964), giving the example 'John is easy to please' and noting that John is the direct object of the verb please. He contrasted it with the sentence 'John is eager to please,' where instead John is the logical subject of please, in order to illustrate that a single static phrase structure tree is inadequate to explain the underlying phenomenon.

=== Object-to-subject raising ===
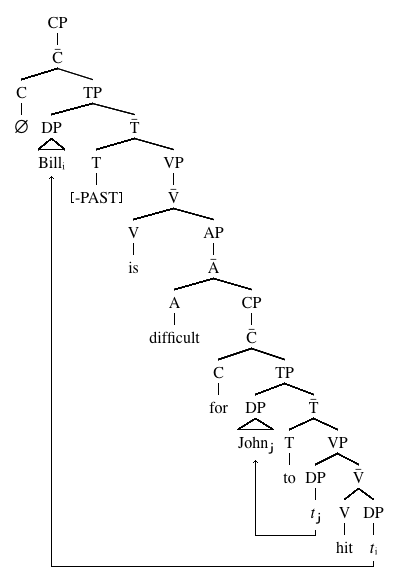
X-bar theory phrase structure tree of a sentence in English showing tough movement as object-to-subject raising

In a thesis supervised by Chomsky, Peter Rosenbaum addressed the construction, identifying "the class of adjectives including "difficult," "easy," and several others." Rosenbaum introduced a transformation analysis, in which the object of the verb phrase moves out of the complement sentence and is raised to the main subject position:

Bill_{i} is difficult [for John to [hit t_{i}]]

(t stands for trace and indicates the gap left in the constituent's original position; the subscript i is an index to show that the subject originated from the trace position.)

=== Null operator raising ===
In classical government and binding theory it is no longer assumed that the object is moved directly to the subject position. Rather, Chomsky (1977) proposed that the subject NP is base-generated in the main clause, and a null operator raises within in the embedded clause:

Chris_{i} is easy [Op_{i} PRO_{j} to please t_{i}] (see the tree diagram of the embedded clause below)
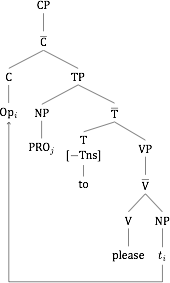

In clauses without an explicit subject, the subject is assumed to be a null/covert (unpronounced) pronoun, designated PRO, which Chomsky called "arbitrary in reference," although the referent(s) may be assumed from context. The evidence for the subject being PRO is that it can participate in partial control, for example:

Gilgamesh_{i} convinced Enkidu_{j} that the cedars_{k} will be fun/easy [PRO_{i+j} to seek t_{k} together_{i+j}].

Finn_{i} persuaded Hengest_{j} that a hall_{k} would be more fun [PRO_{i+j} to meet in t_{k}]

In these two examples, the null PRO is understood to refer to both i and j (both Gilgamesh and Enkidu in the first example; both Finn and Hengest in the second), distinct from the tough movement subject k; partial control is when a controller or antecedent of the subject of an embedded clause is a subset of the understood subject of the embedded clause.

Furthermore Chomsky suggested that instead of separate rules for tough movement, comparative deletion, topicalization, clefting, object-deletion, adjective and adjective-qualifier complements, etc., all might be explained by a more general wh-movement analysis.

=== Tough deletion ===
An alternative explanation for tough constructions involves no movement, relying instead on "Tough Deletion," wherein the subject appears twice in the underlying form, both in the main subject and embedded object positions, and the latter is then deleted, like so:

Fred_{X} is tough for Dick_{Y} to [S Y throw snowballs at X] → Fred is tough for Dick to throw snowballs at.

Postal and Ross argued against this proposal, saying that an additional deletion rule would be required to explain the absence of a subject within the clausal subject in sentences like the following:

Getting herself arrested on purpose is hard for me to imagine Betsy being willing to consider.

Getting herself arrested is said without a subject, and yet herself is understood to refer to Betsy. Due to the need for an extra rule to account for this under "Tough Deletion," a movement analysis is preferred.

== Similar constructions ==
The tough movement construction in English is similar to but distinct from pretty constructions and adjectives modified by too or enough:

These pictures are pretty to look at.
Lee's mattress is too lumpy to sleep on.

For one, these latter constructions do not allow an alternate form with an unraised object:

*It is pretty to look at these pictures.
*It is too lumpy to sleep on Lee's mattress.

or fronted infinitive:

*To look at these pictures is pretty.
*To sleep on Lee's mattress is too lumpy.

== See also ==
- Parasitic gap
- Wh-movement
