= 2020–21 Swedish Basketball League =

Svenska Basketligan
- Season: 2020–21
- Duration: 18 October 2020 - 29 May 2021
- Teams: 9

Regular season
- Season MVP: (Sweden) Viktor Gaddefors

Finals
- Champions: Norrköping Dolphins (8th title)
- Runners-up: Södertälje BBK
- Finals MVP: (Sweden) Adam Ramstedt

Awards
- DPOY: (Sweden) Adam Ramstedt
- ROTY: (Sweden) Barra Njie
- COTY: (Sweden) Mikko Riipinen
- Referee OTY: (Sweden) Apostolos Kalpakas

Statistical leaders
Points	(Sweden) Viktor Gaddefors	20.3
Rebounds	(United States) Cyril Langevine	11.9
Assists	(Canada) Marek Klassen	6.0

Records
- Biggest home win: Borås 125-75 Fryshuset
- Biggest away win: Fryshuset 53-90 Södertälje
- Winning streak: Södertälje (11)
- Losing streak: Fryshuset (23)
- All statistics correct as of 29 August 2021.

The 2020–21 Swedish Basketball League season was the 28th season of the Swedish Basketball League (SBL), the top tier basketball league on Sweden. Borås Basket is the defending champion.

Norrköping Dolphins won its 8th national title after defeating Södertälje BBK 4–0 in the finals.

== Teams ==
Location of teams in the 2020–21 Basketligan

On 16 June 2020, it was announced Fryshuset, winners of the Superettan, were promoted to the SBL. On 25 June 2020, Wetterbygden Stars withdrew from the league due to the lack of financial support.

Team	City	Venue	Capacity
Borås	Borås	Boråshallen	3,000
Fryshuset	Stockholm	Fryshuset Sporthall	1,000
Jämtland	Östersund	Östersunds Sporthall	1,700
Köping Stars	Köping	Karlbergshallen	650
Luleå	Luleå	Luleå Energi Arena	2,700
Norrköping Dolphins	Norrköping	Stadium Arena	3,500
Nässjö	Nässjö	Nässjö Sporthall	1,200
Södertälje Kings	Södertälje	Täljehallen	2,100
Umeå	Umeå	Umeå Energi Arena	2,000

== League table ==
Pos	Team	Pld	W	L	PF	PA	PD	Pts	Qualification
1	Södertälje Kings	32	24	8	2698	2476	+222	48	Qualification to playoffs
2	Norrköping Dolphins	32	23	9	2850	2635	+215	46	Qualification to playoffs
3	Borås	32	22	10	2958	2655	+303	44	Qualification to playoffs
4	Luleå	32	21	11	2742	2557	+185	42	Qualification to playoffs
5	Jämtland	32	18	14	2689	2534	+155	36	Qualification to playoffs
6	Nässjö	32	18	14	2461	2495	−34	36	Qualification to playoffs
7	Köping Stars	32	11	21	2593	2641	−48	22	Qualification to playoffs
8	Umeå	32	6	26	2551	2946	−395	12	Qualification to playoffs
9	Fryshuset	32	1	31	2524	3127	−603	2	

Updated to match(es) played on 11 April 2021. Source: SBL

== Playoffs ==
=== Bracket ===
Quarterfinals
Södertälje Kings	3
Umeå	0
Luleå	1
Jämtland	3
Norrköping Dolphins	3
Köping	1
Borås	2
Nässjö	3

Semifinals
Södertälje Kings	4
Jämtland	3
Norrköping Dolphins	4
Nässjö	2

Finals
Södertälje Kings	0
Norrköping Dolphins	4

=== Quarter-finals ===
Södertälje Kings vs. Umeå

21 April 2021

Södertälje Kings	93–63	Umeå

23 April 2021

Södertälje Kings	82–69	Umeå

26 April 2021

Umeå	81–99	Södertälje Kings
Södertälje win series, 3-0

Norrköping Dolphins vs. Köping Stars

21 April 2021

Norrköping Dolphins	84–71	Köping Stars

23 April 2021

Norrköping Dolphins	86–76	Köping Stars

26 April 2021

Köping Stars	80–78	Norrköping Dolphins

28 April 2021

Köping Stars	82–90	Norrköping Dolphins
Norrköping win series, 3-1

Borås vs. Nässjö

22 April 2021

Borås	96–88	Nässjö

24 April 2021

Borås	82–94	Nässjö

27 April 2021

Nässjö	92–68	Borås

29 April 2021

Nässjö	75–81	Borås

2 May 2021

Borås	79–80	Nässjö
Nässjö win series, 3-2

Luleå vs. Jämtland

22 April 2021

Luleå	89–84	Jämtland

24 April 2021

Luleå	61–84	Jämtland

27 April 2021

Jämtland	92–90	Luleå

29 April 2021

Jämtland	87–72	Luleå
Jämtland win series, 3-1

=== Semi-finals ===
Södertälje Kings vs. Jämtland

6 May 2021

Södertälje Kings	84–70	Jämtland

8 May 2021

Södertälje Kings	87–76	Jämtland

11 May 2021

Jämtland	83–54	Södertälje Kings

13 May 2021

Jämtland	79–51	Södertälje Kings

15 May 2021

Södertälje Kings	86–83	Jämtland

17 May 2021

Jämtland	89–68	Södertälje Kings

19 May 2021

Södertälje Kings	82–73	Jämtland
Södertälje Wins Series 4-3

Norrköping Dolphins vs. Nässjö

7 May 2021

Norrköping Dolphins	85–64	Nässjö

9 May 2021

Norrköping Dolphins	96–67	Nässjö

12 May 2021

Nässjö	76–73	Norrköping Dolphins

14 May 2021

Nässjö	89–79	Norrköping Dolphins

16 May 2021

Norrköping Dolphins	84–71	Nässjö

18 May 2021

Nässjö	86–89	Norrköping Dolphins
Norrköping Win Series 4-2

=== Finals ===
Södertälje Kings vs. Norrköping Dolphins

SVT2

22 May 2021
15:55

Södertälje Kings	69–85	Norrköping Dolphins
Scoring by quarter: 12-25, 22-10, 17-30, 18-20
Pts: Viktor Gaddefors (22); Rebs: Viktor Gaddefors (11); Asts: Trevin Parks (5)		Pts: Terry Larrier (22); Rebs: Kamau Stokes (8); Asts: Kamau Stokes (9)

Täljehallen
Referees: Apostolos Kalpakas, Rickard Eriksson, Davor Gudelj

SVT24

24 May 2021
19:34

Södertälje Kings	65–75	Norrköping Dolphins
Scoring by quarter: 21-19, 7-20, 27-14, 10-22
Pts: Viktor Gaddefors (25); Rebs: Anton Gaddefors (7); Asts: Lazar Radosavljevic (6)		Pts: Terry Larrier (17); Rebs: Adam Ramstedt (11); Asts: Tim Schüberg (5)

Täljehallen
Referees: Saulius Racys, Fedja Serhatlic, Shaker Nasrollah

SVT24

27 May 2021
20:04

Norrköping Dolphins	97–70	Södertälje Kings
Scoring by quarter: 28-16, 31-17, 21-18, 17-19
Pts: Kamau Stokes (21); Rebs: Adam Ramstedt (9); Asts: Kamau Stokes (7)		Pts: Viktor Gaddefors (22); Rebs: Viktor Gaddefors (12); Asts: Viktor Gaddefors (4)

Stadium Arena
Referees: Saulius Racys, Fedja Serhatlic, Shaker Nasrollah

SVT2

29 May 2021
15:55

Norrköping Dolphins	91–86	Södertälje Kings
Scoring by quarter: 31-30, 16-21, 19-19, 25-16
Pts: Phillip Carr (28); Rebs: Adam Ramstedt (14); Asts: Kamau Stokes (6)		Pts: Viktor Gaddefors (31); Rebs: Viktor Gaddefors (9); Asts: Trevin Parks (5)
Norrköping Win Series 4-0

Stadium Arena
Referees: Apostolos Kalpakas, Rickard Eriksson, Davor Gudelj
