= 2023–24 Superettan season =

Superettan
- League: Superettan
- Season: 2023-24
- Duration: 16 September 2023 - 28 April 2024
- Teams: 16
- TV partner: sehtv.se

Regular season
- Season MVP: (Croatia) Tony Vitali
- Promoted: Högsbo; Sloga Uppsala
- Relegated: Helsingborg; Norrort; Kalmar; RIG Mark

Finals
- Champions: Högsbo
- Runners-up: Sloga Uppsala
- Semi-finalists: AIK; Fryshuset

Awards
- Best Guard: (Sweden) Felix Lemetti
- Best Forward: (Sweden) Jonathan Peleg
- Best Center: (Croatia) Tony Vitali
- Best Coach: (Sweden) Fred Draines
- Best Host: Högsbo
- Best Referee: Ismail Gül

Statistical leaders
Points	(Sweden) Felix Lemetti	22.2
Rebounds	(United Kingdom) Kingsley Nwagboso	16.9
Assists	(Sweden) Kasper Hagberg	6.9

Records
- Winning streak: AIK, Högsbo (13)
- Losing streak: Eskilstuna, Rig Mark (8)
- All statistics correct as of 29 April 2024.

The 2023–24 Superettan season is the seventh season of Superettan, the second tier basketball league in Sweden. Helsingborg BBK are the reigning champions from the previous season. Högsbo and Sloga Uppsala were promoted to the Swedish Basketball League for the following season.

Location of teams in the 2023-24 Superettan
Location of Stockholm teams during the 2023-24 season

== Teams ==
Team	City	Venue	Capacity
AIK	Solna	Vasalundshallen	N/A
Eskilstuna Basket	Eskilstuna	STIGA Sports Arena	N/A
IK Eos	Lund	Eoshallen	350
Norrort	Täby	Tibblehallen	1,000
Helsingborg BBK	Helsingborg	GA Hallen	500
Ockelbo BBK	Ockelbo	Kuxahallen	840
Malbas	Malmö	Heleneholms Sporthall	N/A
Wetterbygden	Huskvarna	Huskvarna Sporthall	422
Sloga Uppsala	Uppsala	USIF Arena	N/A
RIG Mark	Kinna	Kinnahallen	N/A
Högsbo	Gothenburg	Gothia Arena	1,000
Tureberg	Sollentuna	Sollentuna Sporthall	320
Huddinge	Huddinge	Edbohallen	N/A
Djurgården	Stockholm	Brännkyrkahallen	500
Fryshuset	Stockholm	Fryshuset Sporthall	1,000
Kalmar	Kalmar	Akea Arena	1,200

== League Table ==
Pos	Team	Pld	W	L	PF	PA	PD	Pts	Qualification
1	Högsbo	30	24	6	2809	2408	+401	48	Promoted to SBL and qualifies to playoffs
2	AIK	30	21	9	2485	2360	+125	42	Qualification to playoffs
3	Huddinge	30	19	11	2442	2335	+107	38	Qualification to playoffs
4	Wetterbygden	30	18	12	2407	2277	+130	36	Qualification to playoffs
5	Fryshuset	30	18	12	2619	2583	+36	36	Qualification to playoffs
6	Sloga Uppsala	30	18	12	2413	2425	−12	36	Qualification to playoffs
7	Tureberg	30	17	13	2325	2255	+70	34	Qualification to playoffs
8	Helsingborg	30	17	13	2582	2411	+171	34	Qualification to playoffs
9	Ockelbo	30	15	15	2230	2304	−74	30	
10	Djurgården	30	15	15	2575	2570	+5	30	
11	Eos Lund	30	14	16	2415	2449	−34	28	
12	Malbas	30	12	18	2202	2290	−88	24	
13	Eskilstuna	30	10	20	2332	2555	−223	20	Relegated to Basketettan
14	Norrort	30	8	22	2208	2399	−191	16	Relegated to Basketettan
15	Kalmar	30	8	22	2357	2488	−131	16	Relegated to Basketettan
16	RIG Mark	30	6	24	2014	2306	−292	12	Relegated to Basketettan

Updated to match(es) played on 10 April 2024. Source: Profixio

== Playoffs ==
Quarterfinals
1	Högsbo	76	96	172
8	Helsingborg	87	64	151
4	Wetterbygden	78	80	158
5	Fryshuset	86	88	174
3	Huddinge	63	74	137
6	Sloga	88	109	197
2	AIK	72	87	159
7	Tureberg	81	70	151

Semifinals
1	Högsbo	103	88	191
5	Fryshuset	70	95	165
6	Sloga	97	82	179
2	AIK	81	84	165

Finals
1	Högsbo	100	80	86	2
6	Sloga	61	95	66	1

== Notable occurrences ==
- On December 3, 2023, 12th placed Malbas ended 1st placed AIK's unbeaten run (13–0).
- On February 16, 2024, Helsingborg announced it would step down from Superettan the following season. The reason being financial difficulties.
