= 2019–20 Swedish Basketball League =

Swedish Basketball League
- Season: 2019–20
- Duration: 25 September 2019 – 13 March 2020
- Teams: 10

Finals
- Champions: Borås; 1st title
- Runners-up: Luleå

Awards
- DPOY: (Sweden) Denzel Andersson
- ROTY: (Sweden) Pelle Larsson
- COTY: (Sweden) Panagiotis Nikolaidis
- Referee OTY: (Sweden) Apostolos Kalpakas

Statistical leaders
| Points | (United States) Ty Sabin | 22.2 |
| Rebounds | (France) Jordan Semple | 9.7 |
| Assists | (Iceland) Elvar Már Friðriksson | 7.7 |

Records
- Biggest home win: Jämtland 111-67 Wetterbydgen
- Biggest away win: Djurgården 73-110 Luleå
- Winning streak: Borås (12)
- Losing streak: Djurgården (13)

The 2019–20 Swedish Basketball League season, formerly known as Basketligan, was the 27th season of the Swedish Basketball League (SBL), the top tier basketball league on Sweden. The season started on 25 September 2019 and ended prematurely on 13 March 2020 due to the coronavirus pandemic. The Södertälje Kings are the defending champions.

Borås was named league champions.

== Competition format ==
The participating teams first play a conventional round-robin schedule with every team playing each opponent four times for a total of 36 games. The top eight teams qualified for the championship playoffs.

Due to the coronavirus pandemic, the competition was suspended from 12 March until 30 April 2020 and playoffs were eliminated. Finally, one day later, the league was terminated and leader Borås was declared as league champion.

== Teams ==
Location of teams in the 2019–20 Basketligan

Djurgården promoted as champion of the Superettan and replaced Uppsala, last qualified in the previous season and relegated.

| Team | City | Venue | Capacity |
|---|---|---|---|
| Borås | Borås | Boråshallen | 3,000 |
| Djurgården | Stockholm | Brännkyrkahallen | 500 |
| Jämtland | Östersund | Östersunds sporthall | 1,700 |
| Köping Stars | Köping | Karlbergshallen | 650 |
| Luleå | Luleå | Luleå Energi Arena | 2,700 |
| Norrköping Dolphins | Norrköping | Stadium Arena | 3,500 |
| Nässjö | Nässjö | Nässjö Sporthall | 1,200 |
| Södertälje Kings | Södertälje | Täljehallen | 2,100 |
| Umeå | Umeå | Umeå Energi Arena | 2,000 |
| Wetterbygden Stars | Huskvarna | Huskvarna Sporthall | 422 |

== Regular season ==
=== League table ===
| Pos | Team | Pld | W | L | PF | PA | PD | Pts |
|---|---|---|---|---|---|---|---|---|
| 1 | Borås (C) | 33 | 28 | 5 | 3000 | 2633 | +367 | 56 |
| 2 | Luleå | 33 | 26 | 7 | 2909 | 2566 | +343 | 52 |
| 3 | Köping Stars | 33 | 24 | 9 | 2805 | 2638 | +167 | 48 |
| 4 | Södertälje Kings | 33 | 19 | 14 | 2723 | 2606 | +117 | 38 |
| 5 | Wetterbygden Stars | 33 | 17 | 16 | 3010 | 3086 | −76 | 34 |
| 6 | Jämtland | 33 | 15 | 18 | 2958 | 2920 | +38 | 30 |
| 7 | Norrköping Dolphins | 33 | 14 | 19 | 2766 | 2759 | +7 | 28 |
| 8 | Nässjö | 33 | 10 | 23 | 2653 | 2844 | −191 | 20 |
| 9 | Umeå | 33 | 8 | 25 | 2663 | 2967 | −304 | 16 |
| 10 | Djurgården | 33 | 4 | 29 | 2732 | 3200 | −468 | 8 |

Updated to match(es) played on 10 March 2020. Source: SBL
(C) Champions

=== Results ===
| Home \ Away | BOR | DJU | JAM | KOP | LUL | NAS | NOR | SOD | UME | WET | BOR | DJU | JAM | KOP | LUL | NAS | NOR | SOD | UME | WET |
|---|---|---|---|---|---|---|---|---|---|---|---|---|---|---|---|---|---|---|---|---|
| Borås | — | 108–80 | 94–79 | 90–91 | 98–88 | 76–72 | 82–76 | 78–66 | 92–81 | 88–84 | — | 116–92 | 102–93 | 88–77 | 84–72 | 86–60 | | 81–62 | 89–76 | 103–102 |
| Djurgården | 92–95 | — | 108–102 | 64–74 | 84–92 | 70–90 | 86–80 | 79–89 | 77–85 | 77–105 | | — | 78–94 | 86–87 | 73–110 | 83–94 | 63–91 | 96–97 | 97–92 | 94–109 |
| Jämtland | 81–99 | 101–81 | — | 90–101 | 94–98 | 81–82 | 90–78 | 98–85 | 89–86 | 121–112 | 75–103 | 107–87 | — | 96–87 | 91–71 | 87–76 | 90–93 | 98–94 | | 111–67 |
| Köping Stars | 75–67 | 92–78 | 89–70 | — | 72–56 | 102–77 | 84–79 | 68–76 | 85–81 | 82–96 | 92–76 | 105–79 | | — | 65–76 | 84–86 | | 74–71 | 92–75 | 93–85 |
| Luleå | 68–85 | 111–75 | 98–95 | 72–76 | — | 63–60 | 95–87 | 75–82 | 83–60 | 100–59 | 84–78 | 97–83 | 89–86 | | — | 85–72 | 92–63 | 87–78 | 87–63 | 112–86 |
| Nässjö | 81–89 | 90–104 | 77–95 | 80–86 | 77–83 | — | 72–75 | 90–79 | 100–86 | 104–109 | 78–105 | | 68–63 | 80–84 | 75–98 | — | 98–84 | 63–61 | 100–80 | |
| Norrköping Dolphins | 73–83 | 94–86 | 94–80 | 76–81 | 85–91 | 113–109 | — | 62–71 | 92–68 | 103–85 | 80–93 | 117–83 | 67–89 | 79–86 | 71–91 | 89–56 | — | | 78–62 | 94–67 |
| Södertälje Kings | 64–81 | 81–77 | 92–86 | 75–84 | 80–84 | 94–68 | 85–66 | — | 84–83 | 91–76 | | 91–62 | 71–65 | 96–87 | 80–84 | 90–71 | 87–88 | — | 93–66 | 91–87 |
| Umeå | 86–80 | 95–85 | 101–82 | 82–84 | 65–101 | 84–83 | 86–94 | 70–87 | — | 93–107 | 68–102 | 102–87 | 86–92 | 67–84 | | | 88–79 | 82–89 | — | 94–105 |
| Wetterbygden Stars | 93–109 | 107–86 | 106–87 | 99–98 | 71–97 | 83–81 | 83–73 | 88–87 | 91–71 | — | 92–100 | | | 90–84 | 93–103 | 93–83 | 97–93 | 86–84 | 97–99 | — |

Updated to match(es) played on 10 March 2020. Source: SBL
Legend: Blue = home team win; Red = away team win.

== Swedish clubs in European competitions ==
| Team | Competition | Progress |
|---|---|---|
| Södertälje Kings | Champions League | Second qualifying round |
| Södertälje Kings | FIBA Europe Cup | Regular season |
| Borås | FIBA Europe Cup | First qualifying round |
