= 2021–22 Superettan season (basketball) =

Second tier basketball league in Sweden

Superettan
- League: Superettan
- Season: 2021-22
- Duration: 25 September 2021 - 1 May 2022
- Games played: 132
- Teams: 12
- TV partner(s): [https://solidsport.com/superettanherr Superettan

Regular season
- Top seed: Uppsala
- Promoted: Uppsala; Kalmar

Finals
- Champions: Uppsala
- Runners-up: Högsbo

Statistical leaders
Points	(United States) Justin Tuckson	23.1
Rebounds	(Sweden) Carl Engström	15.8
Assists	(Sweden) Jimmy Lundin	8.5

Records
- Winning streak: Uppsala (22)
- Losing streak: Team 4Q (9)
- All statistics correct as of 1 May 2022.

Location of teams in the 2021-22 Superettan

The 2021–22 Superettan season is the 5th season of Superettan (SEH), the second tier basketball league in Sweden. No team was awarded champion of the previous season due to the COVID-19 pandemic. Helsingborg BBK are the only new team this season.

== Teams ==
The teams for the 2021–22 season

Team	City	Venue	Capacity
AIK Basket	Stockholm	Vasalundshallen	N/A
Kalmar Saints	Kalmar	Akea Arena	1,200
IK Eos	Lund	Eoshallen	350
Norrort	Stockholm	Tibblehallen	1,000
Helsingborg BBK	Helsingborg	GA Hallen	500
Ockelbo BBK	Ockelbo	Kuxahallen	840
Team Fourth Quarter	Helsingborg	GA Hallen	500
Wetterbygden Stars	Huskvarna	Huskvarna Sporthall	422
Uppsala Basket	Uppsala	Fyrishov	3,000
Trelleborg Pirates	Trelleborg	Västervångshallen	N/A
RIG Mark	Kinna	Kinnahallen	N/A
Högsbo Basket	Gothenburg	Gothia Arena	1,000

== League table ==
Pos	Team	Pld	W	L	PF	PA	PD	Pts	Qualification
1	Uppsala	22	22	0	1922	1560	+362	44	Promoted to SBL and qualifies to playoffs
2	Kalmar	22	17	5	1947	1650	+297	34	Qualification to playoffs
3	Högsbo	22	16	6	2003	1809	+194	32	Qualification to playoffs
4	Trelleborg	22	12	10	1891	1846	+45	24	Qualification to playoffs
5	Wetterbygden	22	12	10	1742	1797	−55	24	Qualification to playoffs
6	IK Eos Lund	22	12	10	2053	2044	+9	24	Qualification to playoffs
7	Helsingborg	22	10	12	1785	1789	−4	20	Qualification to playoffs
8	RIG Mark	22	10	12	1713	1809	−96	20	Unable to qualify do to being a federation team
9	Norrort	22	7	15	1893	1940	−47	14	Qualification to playoffs
10	Ocklebo	22	6	16	1692	1819	−127	12	
11	Team Fourth Quarter	22	4	18	1708	2068	−360	8	
12	AIK	22	4	18	1683	1901	−218	8	

Updated to match(es) played on 17 March 2022. Source: Profixio

== Playoffs ==
Quarterfinals
1	Uppsala	91	87	178
8	Norrort	73	88	161
4	Trelleborg	73	85	158
5	Wetterbygden	68	106	174
2	Högsbo	101	106	207
7	IK EOS	88	89	177
2	Kalmar	79	104	183
7	Helsingborg	75	69	144

Semifinals
Uppsala	84	95	179
Wetterbygdan	62	68	130
Högsbo	86	68	154
Kalmar	74	75	149

Finals
Uppsala	96	82	75	2
Högsbo	105	64	67	1
