= Corban Collins =

American basketball player

Personal information
- Born: July 21, 1994 (age 32) High Point, North Carolina, U.S.
- Listed height: 6 ft 3 in (1.91 m)
- Listed weight: 190 lb (86 kg)

Career information
- High school: Christ School (Arden, North Carolina); Massanutten Military (Woodstock, Virginia)
- College: LSU (2012–2013); Morehead State (2014–2016); Alabama (2016–2017)
- NBA draft: 2017: undrafted
- Playing career: 2017–2022
- Position: Shooting guard

Career history
- 2017–2018: VfL Kirchheim Knights
- 2018–2019: BC Luleå
- 2019: Pallacanestro Cantù
- 2019–2020: Blu Basket 1971
- 2020–2021: A.S. Junior Pallacanestro Casale
- 2021–2022: Helsinki Seagulls
- 2022: Trepça
- 2022: Södertälje BBK

Career highlights
- Kosovo Cup (2022); Second-team All-OVC (2016)

Corban Collins (born July 21, 1994) is an American former professional basketball player. He played college basketball at LSU, Morehead State and Alabama.

== College career ==
=== LSU ===
Collins began his collegiate career playing for the LSU Tigers and averaged 2.6 points and 9.1 minutes played in 27 games as a freshman. He decided to leave the program following the end of the season and chose to transfer to Morehead State over Murray State and Central Florida.

=== Morehead State ===
Collins spent three seasons as a member of the Morehead State Eagles, sitting out as a true sophomore due to NCAA transfer rules. As a redshirt sophomore, Collins made 19 starts for the Eagles and averaged 8.8 points per game. He was named second team All-Ohio Valley Conference after leading the Eagles with 11.0 points per game and finishing second in the conference with a .425 Three-point shooting percentage.

=== Alabama ===
Collins played his final season at Alabama. He averaged 7.0 points and 1.8 rebounds per game.

== Professional career ==
=== Kirchheim Knights ===
Collins signed with VfL Kirchheim Knights of the German second division, ProA, on October 9, 2017. In his first professional season, Collins finished third in the league with 17.3 points per game and recorded 4.6 rebounds, 3.8 assists and 1.2 steals per game.

=== Luleå ===
Collins signed with BC Luleå of the Swedish Basketligan on July 7, 2018. Collins finished second in the Basketligan in scoring with 19.4 points per game and while also averaging 4.4 rebounds, 4.9 assists (6th in the league) and 1.6 steals per game.

=== Pallacanestro Cantù ===
Collins signed with Pallacanestro Cantù of the Italian Lega Basket Serie A on July 26, 2019. Collins left the team in December 2019. He averaged 6.8 points, 1.7 rebounds and 1.8 assists over 11 games for Cantu.

=== Blu Basket 1971 ===
Collins signed with Blu Basket 1971 of the Italian second division, Serie A2 Basket, on December 30, 2019. He averaged 19.1 points, 3.1 rebounds and 3.8 assists per game.

=== A.S. Junior Pallacanestro Casale ===
On November 19, 2020, Collins signed with A.S. Junior Pallacanestro Casale. In five games, he averaged 12 points and 3.4 assists per game.

=== Helsinki Seagulls ===
On January 19, 2021, Collins signed with the Helsinki Seagulls of the Korisliiga. He averaged 8.0 points, 2.6 rebounds, and 2.5 assists per game.

=== KB Trepça ===
On January 13, 2022, Collins signed with KB Trepça of the Kosovo Basketball Superleague.

=== Södertälje BBK ===
Collins signed with Swedish team Södertälje BBK for the 2022-23 campaign. Due to a hip injury, the contract was terminated in October 2022. He subsequently announced the end of his professional career.
