= 2018–19 Basketligan season =

Basketligan
- Season: 2018–19
- Duration: 21 September 2018 – May 2019
- Teams: 10

Regular season
- Relegated: Uppsala

Finals
- Champions: Södertälje Kings (12th title)
- Runners-up: Borås

Records
- Winning streak: Borås (8)
- Losing streak: Uppsala (27)

The 2018–19 Basketligan season was the 26th season of the Basketligan, the top tier basketball league on Sweden. Norrköping Dolphins were the defending champions.

== Teams ==
Location of teams in the 2018–19 Basketligan

Köping Stars and Wetterbygden Stars joined the league.

Team	City	Venue	Capacity
Luleå	Luleå	Luleå Energi Arena	2,700
Borås	Borås	Boråshallen	3,000
Jämtland	Östersund	Östersunds sporthall	1,700
Köping Stars	Köping	Karlbergshallen	
Norrköping Dolphins	Norrköping	Stadium Arena	4,500
Nässjö	Nässjö	Nässjö Sporthall	Unknown
Södertälje Kings	Södertälje	Täljehallen	2,200
Umeå	Umeå	Umeå Energi Arena	1,270
Uppsala	Uppsala	IFU Arena	2,880
Wetterbygden Stars	Huskvarna	Huskvarna Sporthall	

== Regular season ==
=== League table ===
Pos	Team	Pld	W	L	PF	PA	PD	Pts	Qualification or relegation
1	Södertälje Kings	36	29	7	3088	2797	+291	58	Qualification to playoffs
2	Borås	36	27	9	3444	3091	+353	54	Qualification to playoffs
3	Norrköping Dolphins	36	27	9	3032	2651	+381	54	Qualification to playoffs
4	Luleå	36	24	12	3082	2850	+232	48	Qualification to playoffs
5	Jämtland	36	23	13	3422	3189	+233	46	Qualification to playoffs
6	Nässjö	36	14	22	2855	2992	−137	28	Qualification to playoffs
7	Wetterbygden Stars	36	12	24	2839	2945	−106	24	Qualification to playoffs
8	Umeå	36	9	27	3017	3255	−238	18	Qualification to playoffs
9	Köping Stars (O)	36	9	27	2805	3108	−303	18	Qualification to relegation playoffs
10	Uppsala (R)	36	3	33	2776	3482	−706	6	Relegated to Superettan

Source: Basketligan
(O) Play-off winners; (R) Relegated

=== Results ===
Home \ Away	BOR	JAM	KOP	LUL	NOR	NAS	SOD	UME	UPP	WET	BOR	JAM	KOP	LUL	NOR	NAS	SOD	UME	UPP	WET
Borås	—	90–93	111–75	75–87	97–84	103–80	76–85	113–82	113–83	95–74	—	110–94	107–70	110–82	95–92	79–78	90–72	91–84	101–84	84–79
Jämtland	120–113	—	95–61	92–108	97–89	101–93	95–100	98–95	107–59	93–91	106–103	—	93–80	95–99	94–82	89–66	73–86	118–85	117–98	100–90
Köping Stars	83–86	84–91	—	80–79	67–78	75–82	68–81	83–71	101–92	55–98	72–101	103–108	—	68–86	71–79	85–73	76–81	73–76	96–77	100–71
Luleå	97–80	87–78	86–71	—	77–79	96–68	75–68	89–82	107–80	77–88	97–107	99–88	87–79	—	80–64	90–74	60–61	93–95	94–58	88–83
Norrköping Dolphins	101–63	89–84	70–65	74–53	—	83–68	72–77	90–73	97–65	91–71	83–85	84–76	83–65	84–76	—	80–48	92–64	72–52	107–69	78–67
Nässjö	83–88	108–82	72–69	85–81	84–82	—	82–87	84–92	113–71	99–86	69–95	88–94	80–82	65–68	56–89	—	75–82	86–76	99–74	79–78
Södertälje Kings	101–93	97–78	91–77	93–95	89–82	89–81	—	86–75	105–57	79–73	93–75	97–92	94–68	86–89	85–86	79–70	—	86–74	97–68	80–65
Umeå	87–106	81–112	104–83	78–100	72–93	80–71	73–83	—	111–93	75–81	91–105	84–98	100–93	87–82	72–81	77–79	94–100	—	108–91	100–98
Uppsala	84–113	87–109	68–70	59–90	81–95	91–78	70–88	76–91	—	80–89	95–103	76–106	88–97	67–83	72–84	77–87	74–89	89–80	—	82–87
Wetterbygden Stars	80–104	62–93	86–85	62–74	70–85	77–79	76–80	102–79	92–56	—	71–84	65–63	83–75	85–71	71–76	65–63	68–77	77–81	78–85	—

Source: Basketligan
Legend: Blue = home team win; Red = away team win.

== Playoffs ==
The playoffs are played with a best-of-five format (1-1-1-1-1).

=== Bracket ===
Quarterfinals
Södertälje Kings	3
Umeå	0
Luleå	2
Jämtland	3
Borås	3
Wetterbygden Stars	1
Norrköping Dolphins	3
Nässjö	0

Semifinals
Södertälje Kings	4
Jämtland	2
Borås	4
Norrköping Dolphins	2

Finals
Södertälje Kings	4
Borås	1

=== Quarterfinals ===
Team 1	Series	Team 2	Game 1	Game 2	Game 3	Game 4	Game 5
Södertälje Kings	3–0	Umeå	90–73	87–72	85–70		
Borås	3–1	Wetterbygden Stars	98–64	80–64	93–94	74–61	
Norrköping Dolphins	3–0	Nässjö	72–56	84–83	91–85		
Luleå	2–3	Jämtland	97–92	80–89	110–80	75–86	90–103

=== Semifinals ===
Seeded teams played legs 1, 3, 5 and 7 at home.

Team 1	Series	Team 2	Game 1	Game 2	Game 3	Game 4	Game 5	Game 6	Game 7
Södertälje Kings	4–2	Jämtland	86–73	100–91	86–70	76–84	78–79	76–85	
Borås	4–2	Norrköping Dolphins	69–52	67–85	95–74	108–65	57–86	92–80	

=== Finals ===
Seeded team played legs 1, 3, 5 and 7 at home.

Team 1	Series	Team 2	Game 1	Game 2	Game 3	Game 4	Game 5	Game 6	Game 7
Södertälje Kings	4–1	Borås	92–81	78–63	79–76	80–97	81–70		

== Relegation playoffs ==
The ninth qualified and the runner-up of the Superettan played a double-legged playoff for a place in the next Basketligan season.

Team 1	Agg.	Team 2	1st leg	2nd leg
Alvik	117–184	Köping Stars	48–89	69–95

== Swedish clubs in European competitions ==
Team	Competition	Progress
Norrköping Dolphins	Champions League	First qualifying round
Luleå	Europe Cup	Second qualifying round
Södertälje Kings	Europe Cup	First qualifying round
