= Obinna Oleka =

American basketball player (born 1993)

No. 4 – Piratas de La Guaira
- Position: Forward
- League: SPB

Personal information
- Born: November 4, 1993 (age 33) Washington, D.C.
- Listed height: 6 ft 8 in (2.03 m)
- Listed weight: 225 lb (102 kg)

Career information
- High school: Florida Christian (Cape Coral, Florida)
- College: SCF Manatee–Sarasota (2012–2013); Arizona State (2015–2017)
- NBA draft: 2017: undrafted
- Playing career: 2017–present

Career history
- 2017–2018: New Basket Brindisi
- 2018: Argentino de Junín
- 2018–2019: St. John's Edge
- 2019: Gigantes de Jalisco
- 2019–2020: Djurgården
- 2021: Bashkimi Prizren
- 2021–2022: Beroe
- 2022–present: Piratas de La Guaira

Career highlights
- CIBACOPA All-Star (2019)

Obinna Oleka (born November 4, 1993) is an American professional basketball player for Piratas de La Guaira of the Venezuelan Basketball League. He played college basketball at Arizona State.

== Early life ==
Oleka grew up in Washington, D.C., with his mother and brother. He played high school basketball at Florida Christian Institute in Cape Coral, Florida, where he averaged 24 points and 11 rebounds as a senior and earned an invitation to the ESBC All-Star Game. He also played Amateur Athletic Union (AAU) basketball with DC Assault.

== College career ==
=== State College of Florida, Manatee–Sarasota ===
Coming out of high school, Oleka was considered a three-star recruit by Rivals.com. However, he was academically ineligible to play for a major college, so he instead started playing junior college basketball at the State College of Florida, Manatee–Sarasota (SCF Manatee–Sarasota) in 2012. As a freshman, Oleka recorded 10.9 points and 6.2 rebounds per game. He was named NJCAA Division I Player of the Week for the week of February 18 to 24, 2013, after a game against Hillsborough Community College in which he put up 32 points, 17 rebounds and 8 assists off the bench. He recorded 22 points, 13 rebounds and four blocks in a 95–73 victory over St. Petersburg College, securing a runner-up finish in the Suncoast Conference and a berth in the state tournament. In the opening round, Oleka had 29 points and 12 rebounds in their 90–77 loss to the College of Central Florida.

As a sophomore, Oleka averaged 25.6 points and 13.6 rebounds per game. In his first game of the season, he recorded 27 points, 19 rebounds and eight assists in a 92–83 win against Miami Dade College. However, he only played in five games before he was suspended from the team for violating team rules, and he left the school in December 2013. Oleka had signed a letter of intent (LOI) early on in the season to play for the Texas Longhorns, choosing them over from schools such as Gonzaga, Old Dominion, Oregon State, Southern Miss, South Carolina, and Utah State, but the offer from Texas was revoked after his suspension. He spent the 2014–15 season off from basketball while taking classes at Cecil College in North East, Maryland.

=== Arizona State ===
In the 2015 offseason, nearly two years after playing his last competitive game, Oleka got a call from newly hired Arizona State head coach Bobby Hurley, and he was offered a scholarship to play NCAA Division I basketball for the Sun Devils. Oleka, who was ranked a top 20 junior college recruit by jucorecruiting.com at the time, was also Hurley's first recruit after taking over the program in April.

He made his debut for the team against Sacramento State on November 13, 2015, 705 days after his last college basketball game. After almost two months on the bench, he permanently replaced third-year forward Savon Goodman in the starting-lineup in their second conference regular-season game against USC on January 7, 2016. In 32 games, he had averages of 9.6 points and 6.1 rebounds per contest while the Sun Devils lost in the quarterfinals of the 2015 Pac-12 Conference tournament.

In 2016–17, Oleka started all but one of the 33 games he played, averaging 12.5 points and 9.9 rebounds per game. Measuring 6’8, he played at the center position for much of the season in an undersized lineup, often playing with four guards. On February 26, 2017, he grabbed his 10th rebound of the game to seal a one-point upset of USC. It was his 15th double-double of the season, tying Ike Diogu for the most in school history since they joined the then-Pac-10 Conference in 1978. He broke the record two weeks later, when he posted a career-high 27 points and 13 rebounds in an overtime win against Stanford in the first round of the 2017 Pac-12 Conference tournament. However, the Sun Devils lost by a score of 80–57 to Oregon, again in the quarterfinals, in what was Oleka's final college game. His 327 rebounds that year were the third-best mark in school history at the time.

== Professional career ==
Oleka played at the Portsmouth Invitational Tournament in April, averaging 9.3 points and 8.7 rebounds per game. In May, he had pre-draft workout with the Utah Jazz, but went undrafted in the 2017 NBA draft.

Oleka signed his first professional contract with Italian Lega Basket Serie A team New Basket Brindisi in July. He played in a limited role off the bench for the club, appearing in 13 games and averaging 2.5 points and 2.8 rebounds per contest. Oleka joined Argentine team Argentino de Junín in October, replacing the outgoing Calvin Crawford. However, after playing only two games in the 2018 Torneo Súper 20 playoffs against Obras, he was cut from the team the following month. He was subsequently replaced by Leron Black. In December 2018, Oleka reached a deal to play with the St. John's Edge of the National Basketball League of Canada for the remainder of the 2018–19 season. He made his NBL Canada debut in a win over the Island Storm on December 14, adding 12 points and a team-leading 11 rebounds on the same night Glen "Big Baby" Davis made his Edge debut. Two days later, in a rematch against the Island Storm, Oleka scored 12 points off the bench and again led his team in rebounds with seven to extend their winning streak to three games after a 1–5 start. He grabbed a season-high 24 rebounds in a 109–100 victory at home against the London Lightning on January 19 for their sixth consecutive win.

In 23 games with the Edge, he averaged 7.6 points and 10.4 rebounds in 24.8 minutes per game. He was the team's leading rebounder when he made the move to Gigantes de Jalisco, an expansion team in the Mexican Circuito de Baloncesto de la Costa del Pacífico (CIBACOPA), in March 2019. The Gigantes opened their season with a loss to Tijuana Zonkeys on March 27, but defeated the Zonkeys 103–87 the following day for their historic first win. Oleka, a starter, recorded 20 points and 11 rebounds. He scored 31 points in Jalisco's home opener against Halcones de Ciudad Obregón on April 5 to lead them to an 83–75 win. He topped that mark by dropping 34 points in a win over Caballeros de Culiacán on April 23, and was selected to play in the 2019 CIBACOPA All-Star Game in Guadalajara in May.

That summer, Oleka signed with Hungarian team KTE-Duna Aszfalt of the Nemzeti Bajnokság I/A on a one-year contract. However, he did not appear in any games with the team, and instead joined newly promoted Swedish Basketball League (SBL) club Djurgården. He made his league debut in a loss against Köping Stars on October 4, contributing 15 points and a game-high nine rebounds. Two games later, he notched his first double-double with 14 points and 12 rebounds against Umeå BSKT. His season-high for points was 23 at Wetterbygden Stars on October 25, and his best rebounding game was on November 15 against Södertälje Kings when he grabbed 18 boards. In 19 games played with Djurgårdens, Oleka averaged 11.1 points and 8.8 rebounds per contest, finishing third in the league in the latter category. Eurobasket.com named him an All-SBL honorable mention for the season.

In February 2021, Oleka signed with Bashkimi Prizren of the Kosovo Superleague. In his team debut on February 27, he recorded 14 points and 24 rebounds in a win over Prishtina. He posted a nearly identical stat line on March 7 with a 13-point, 24-rebound performance in a losing effort against Trepça. On March 27, Oleka recorded 25 points and 19 rebounds in a loss to Rahoveci. In game 1 of their quarterfinals series against Ylli, he tallied a season-high 30 points (on 15 of 19 shooting) and 15 rebounds in the 94–79 overtime victory. Oleka posted 20 points and 15 rebounds in game 2, then 24 points and 13 rebounds in game 3, but his team was eliminated after losing both games. After averaging 18.4 points and 15.2 rebounds per game across the regular season and playoffs, he was given second-team All-Kosovan League honors by Eurobasket.com.

== Career statistics ==
Legend
| GP | Games played | GS | Games started | MPG | Minutes per game |
| FG% | Field goal percentage | 3P% | 3-point field goal percentage | FT% | Free throw percentage |
| RPG | Rebounds per game | APG | Assists per game | SPG | Steals per game |
| BPG | Blocks per game | PPG | Points per game | **Bold** | Career high |

=== College ===
| Year | Team | GP | GS | MPG | FG% | 3P% | FT% | RPG | APG | SPG | BPG | PPG |
|---|---|---|---|---|---|---|---|---|---|---|---|---|
| 2015–16 | Arizona State | 32 | 18 | 24.8 | .395 | .314 | .777 | 6.1 | 0.7 | .7 | .5 | 9.6 |
| 2016–17 | Arizona State | 33 | 32 | 32.9 | .430 | .253 | .719 | 9.9 | 1.2 | 1.0 | .8 | 12.5 |
| Career | | 65 | 50 | 28.9 | .415 | .282 | .719 | 8.0 | .9 | .8 | .7 | 11.1 |

== Personal life ==
Oleka is of Nigerian descent, and has a Nigerian passport. His given name Obinna means "father's heart" or "father's throne" in Igbo.
