= Thomas Massamba =

Swedish-Congolese basketball player

Personal information
- Born: March 28, 1985 (age 41) Kinshasa, Congo
- Listed height: 6 ft 1 in (1.85 m)
- Listed weight: 170 lb (77 kg)

Career information
- NBA draft: 2007: undrafted
- Playing career: 2005–present
- Position: Point guard

Career history
- 2005–2008: 08 Stockholm HR
- 2008–2010: Södertälje Kings
- 2010: 08 Stockholm HR
- 2010–2012: ETHA Engomis
- 2012–2013: Lukoil Academic
- 2013–2014: ČEZ Nymburk
- 2014–2015: ETHA Engomis
- 2015–2016: Keravnos
- 2016: KB Prishtina
- 2016–2017: Södertälje Kings
- 2017: MKS Dąbrowa Górnicza
- 2017–2018: Lions de Geneve
- 2018–2019: Luleå
- 2019–2020: Jämtland
- 2020–2021: Phoenix Brussels
- 2021: Tindastóll

Career highlights
- Czech League champion (2014); Czech Cup winner (2014); Bulgarian League champion (2013); Bulgarian Cup champion (2013); Kosovo Cup winner (2016); Cypriot League champion (2011, 2012); Cypriot Cup winner (2011, 2015); Swedish League champion (2005)

Thomas Kalmeba-Massamba (born March 28, 1985) is a Swedish-Congolese professional basketball player who last played for Tindastóll of the Úrvalsdeild karla.

== Career ==
Massamba has played for 08 Stockholm, Södertälje Kings, Solna Vikings, Lukoil Academic and ČEZ Nymburk. For the 2014–15 season, he signed for ETHA Engomis. At 2015 he was selected as "Best Player of the Year", "Guard of The Year", as well as earning "Defensive Player of the Year" in Cyprus. Massamba was also nominated for "First All Team", "All-Bosmans Team" and "All-Defensive Team". Thomas Massamba was also selected in Cyprus League's All-Star Game.

This season Massamba led the league in assists, 5.4 as. per game, and recorded game high of 30 points against Keravnos and Apoel. In 2013 and 2014, Massamba played for CEZ Basketball Nymburk who was competing in FIBA Eurocup, Euroleague Qualification and VTB. In 2012 and 2013, Massamba played for Lukoil Academic Sofia (Bulgaria-NBL), who was in the Euroleague Qualification and FIBA Eurocup. He also played for Etha Engomis, competing in the Eurochallenge and the Eurocup Qualification, and the Sodertalje Kings, 08 Stockholm, and Solna Vikings in Sweden. Rookie of the year (Sweden 2004).

This player won everywhere he played, he was the Swedish Basketligan Champion (2005), Cyprus Cup Winner (2011 and 2015), Cyprus League Champion (2011, 2012), Cyprus Supercup Winner (MVP), Bulgarian Cup Winner (2013), Bulgarian League Regular Season Champion (2013), Bulgarian League Champion (2013), Czech Rep. Cup Winner (2014) Czech Rep. League Regular Season Champion (2014), Czech Rep. League Champion (2014).

On 7 March the playmaker became official in the ranks of champion of Kosovo and the Balkan League, KB Prishtina.

On July 6, 2020, he has signed with Phoenix Brussels of the Pro Basketball League.

In July 2021, Massamba signed with Úrvalsdeild karla club Tindastóll. He left the team in end of December after averaging 9.1 points, 4.6 assists and 5.1 assists in 10 games.

== National team career ==
Thomas Masamba also played for the Swedish National Team Program. He was part of Sweden's U20 National Team and is currently the Captain of Sweden's National Team. In Summer 2013, Massamba played in the European Championships.
