= Dee Ayuba =

British Nigerian basketball player

Personal information
- Born: 22 March 1986 London, England
- Died: 2 January 2018 (aged 31) Luxembourg

Career information
- College: Seminole State (2003–2005); Kansas City (2005–2007)
- NBA draft: 2007: undrafted

Career history
- ?–?: Iraklis Thessaloniki B.C.
- ?–?: Norrköping Dolphins
- ?–?: Uppsala Basket
- ?–?: Jämtland Basket
- ?–?: Djurgårdens IF

Oladapo Kanyinsola "Dee" Ayuba (22 March 1986 – 2 January 2018) was a British Nigerian basketball player (forward).

Born in London, Ayuba spent four years of playing basketball for the University of Missouri-Kansas City in the NCAA. He began his professional European career for Plannja Basket from 2007-08. He returned to play for Iraklis Thessaloniki B.C. in the Greek A2 Basket League.

After that, he played five seasons for the Norrköping Dolphins, a season with Uppsala Basket, and one season with Jämtland Basket. He played several seasons in the Basketligan and won the Swedish Champion in Basketball award two times and participated in the European Cup Games with Norrköping Dolphins in 2012. By the time New Year 2018 had come and gone, Ayuba was playing for the basketball department of Djurgårdens IF from their 2016–17 season onward. He played for a season with Residence Walferdange (Luxembourg).

== Death ==
Ayuba died in Luxembourg on 2 January 2018 from a heart attack, age 31.
