= Martin Pahlmblad =

Swedish basketball player

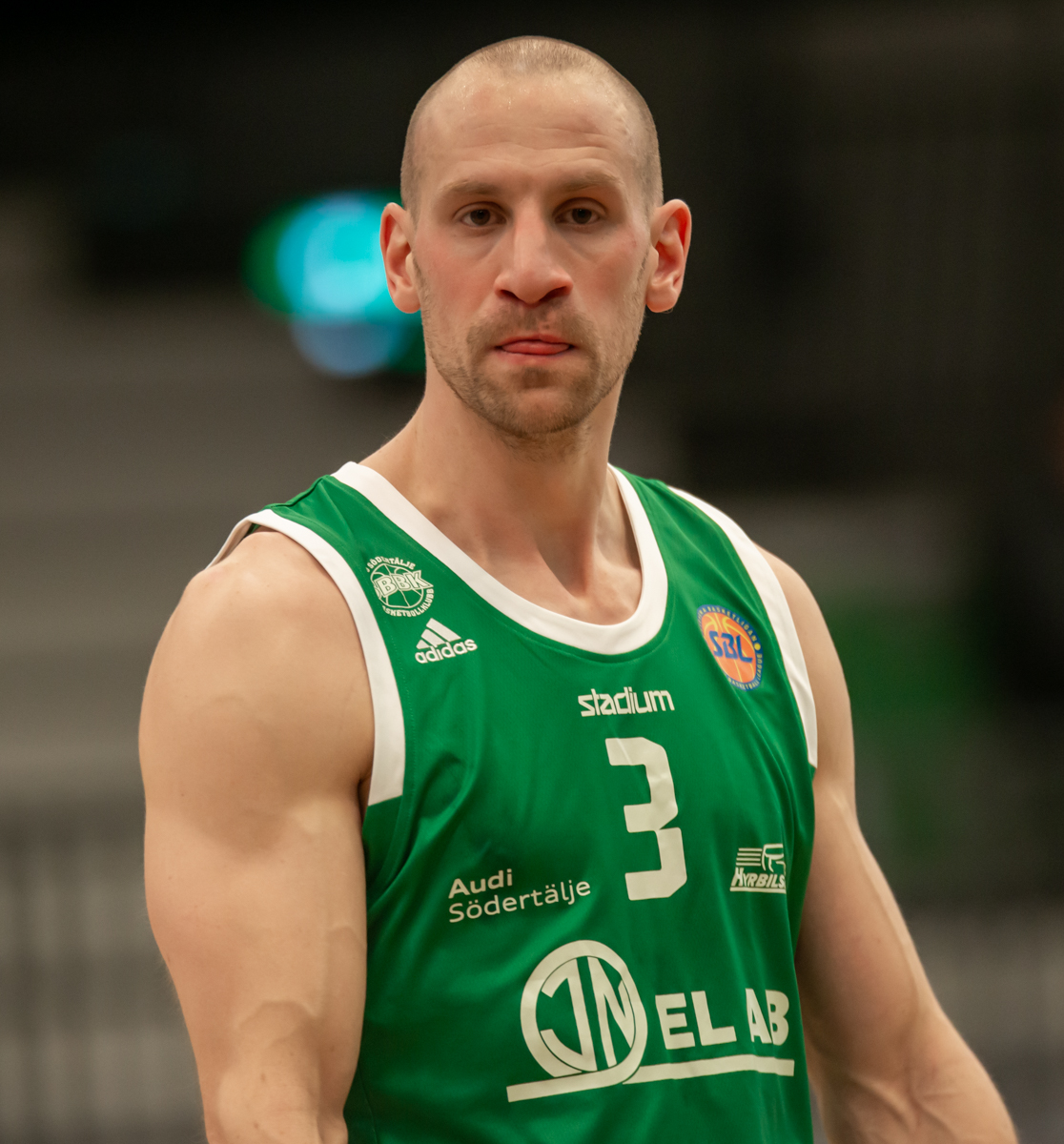
- Pahlmblad in 2020

No. 3 – Södertälje BBK
- Position: Shooting guard
- League: Basketligan

Personal information
- Born: May 9, 1986 (age 40) Lund, Scania
- Listed height: 6 ft 4 in (1.93 m)
- Listed weight: 195 lb (88 kg)

Career information
- NBA draft: 2008: undrafted
- Playing career: 2003–present

Career history
- 2003–2005: Eos Lund IK
- 2005–2010: Solna Vikings
- 2010–2012: LF Basket
- 2012–2014: Södertälje Kings
- 2014–2015: PVSK Panthers
- 2015–2016: Apollon Patras
- 2016–2017: Kymis
- 2017–present: Södertälje Kings / Södertälje BBK

Career highlights
- 4× Swedish League champion (2008, 2013, 2014, 2019)

Martin Pahlmblad (born May 9, 1986) is a Swedish professional basketball player for the Swedish team Södertälje BBK of the Basketligan.

== Professional career ==
During his professional career, Pahlmblad has played with Solna Vikings, LF Basket, Södertälje Kings and PVSK Panthers.

On August 3, 2015, he signed with Apollon Patras of the Greek Basketball League. After one year, he left the club and joined the newly promoted in the Greek Basket League Kymis.

On July 27, 2017, Pahlmblad returned to Södertälje Kings of the Basketligan after 3 years.

== National team career ==
Pahlmblad has also played for the Swedish Basketball National Team Program. He was in the default squad for the EuroBasket 2017 qualification.
