= Lazar Radosavljević =

Serbian basketball player

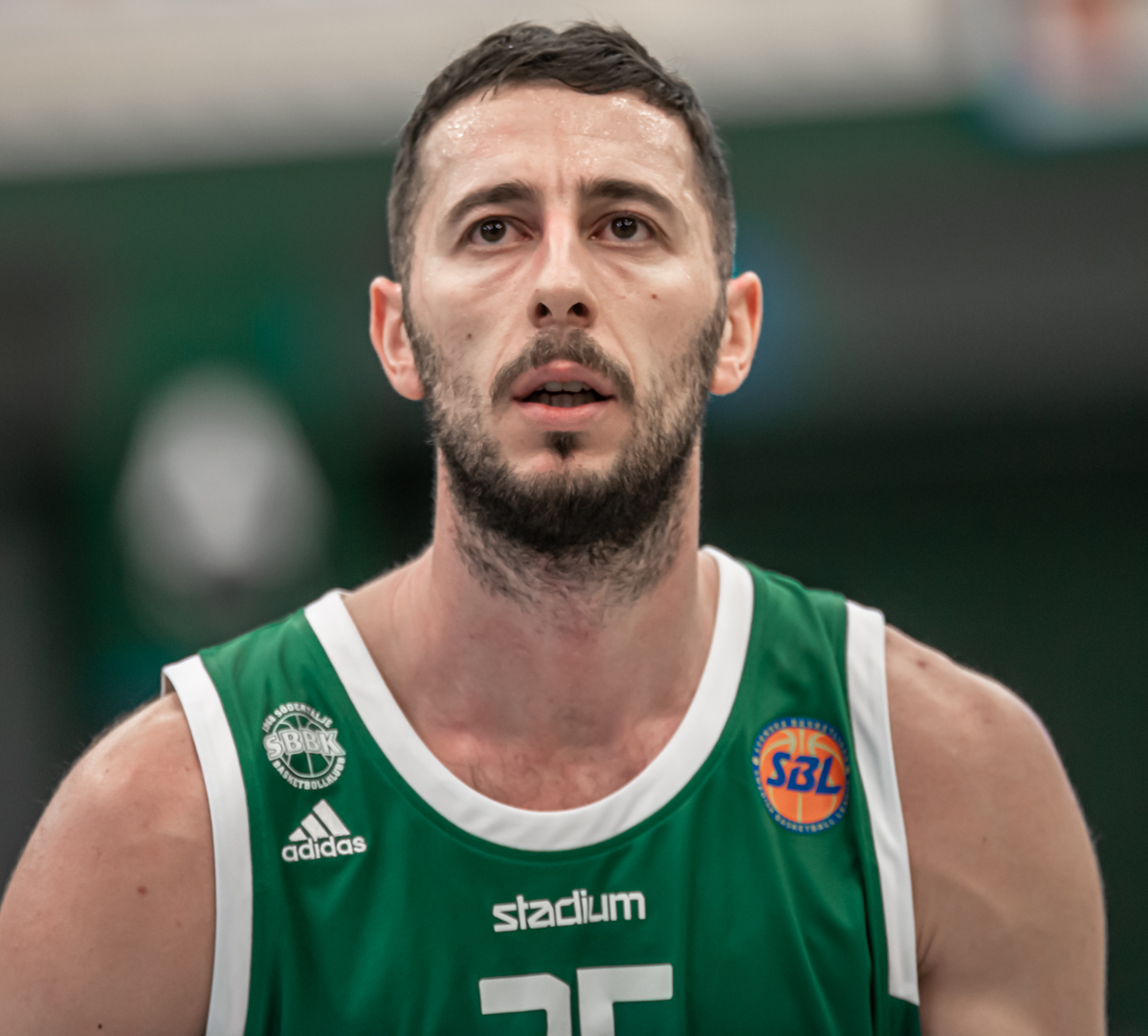
- Radosavljević with Södertälje BBK in October 2021

No. 25 – Södertälje BBK
- Position: Small forward / power forward
- League: Swedish Basketball League

Personal information
- Born: 9 April 1991 (age 35) Leposavić, FR Yugoslavia
- Listed height: 2.04 m (6 ft 8 in)
- Listed weight: 99 kg (218 lb)

Career information
- NBA draft: 2013: undrafted
- Playing career: 2008–present

Career history
- 2008–2009: Crvena zvezda 2
- 2009–2011: Crvena zvezda
- 2011–2013: Mornar
- 2013–2014: APOEL
- 2014–2015: Asseco Gdynia
- 2015–2016: Energia Rovinari
- 2016: Pieno žvaigždės
- 2017: Södertälje Kings
- 2017: Djurgården
- 2017–2018: AIK Basket
- 2018–2020: Djurgårdens
- 2020–present: Södertälje BBK
Medals
Men's basketball
Representing Serbia
U18 European Championship
Gold medal – first place	2009 France	U18 Team
U16 European Championship
Gold medal – first place	2007 Greece	U16 Team

Lazar Radosavljević (Serbian Cyrillic: Лазар Радосављевић; born 9 April 1991) is a Serbian professional basketball player for Södertälje BBK of the Swedish Basketball League.

== Professional career ==
Radosavljević played for Crvena zvezda, Mornar, APOEL, Asseco Gdynia, Energia, Pieno žvaigždės, Södertälje Kings, AIK Basket, and Djurgården.

In June 2020, Radosavljević signed for Södertälje BBK.

== National team career ==
In July 2007, Radosavljević was a member of the Serbia U16 national team that won the gold medal at the FIBA Europe Under-16 Championship in Greece. Over eight tournament games, he averaged 10.5 points, six rebounds, and 1.2 assists per game. In July and August 2009, Radosavljević was a member of the Serbia U18 national team that won the gold medal at the FIBA Europe Under-18 Championship in France. Over nine tournament games, he averaged 8.6 points, six rebounds, and 1.3 assists per game. In July and August 2011, Radosavljević was a member of the Serbia U20 national team at the FIBA Europe Under-20 Championship in Bilbao, Spain. Over eight tournament games, he averaged four points and 1.4 rebounds per game.

== Career achievements ==
- Cyprus Division A champion: 1 (with APOEL: 2013–14)
- Swedish Second League champion: 1 (with Djurgården: 2018–19)
