= Alexander Lindqvist =

Swedish basketball player

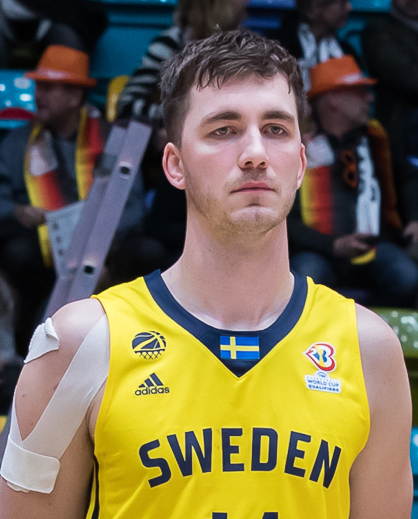

Södertälje BBK
- Position: Small forward
- League: Swedish Basketball League

Personal information
- Born: 12 February 1991 (age 35)
- Listed height: 202 cm (6 ft 8 in)
- Listed weight: 97 kg (214 lb)

Career information
- Playing career: 2008–present

Career history
- 2008–2011: Solna Vikings
- 2009–2010: →Solna Branten BK
- 2011–2013: Södertälje Kings
- 2012: →Tälje Knights
- 2013–2014: KFUM Nässjö
- 2014–2015: Solna Vikings
- 2015: Trikala Aries
- 2015–2017: Uppsala Basket
- 2016: Proximus Spirou
- 2018–2019: Södertälje Kings
- 2019–2020: BTTB Mallorca-Palma
- 2020–2021: Stjarnan
- 2021–present: Södertälje BBK

Career highlights
- 2× Basketligan champion (2013, 2019); Icelandic Super Cup (2020)

Alexander Lindqvist (born 12 February 1991) is a Swedish basketball player and a member of the Swedish national team. He won the Swedish championship in 2013 and 2019 as a member of the Södertälje Kings.

== Playing career ==
In October 2019, Lindqvist signed with LEB Oro club BTTB Mallorca-Palma.

In September 2020, Lindqvist signed with Úrvalsdeild karla club Stjarnan. On 27 September, he won the Icelandic Super Cup after Stjarnan defeated Grindavík in the Cup final.

== National team career ==
Lindqvist debuted with the Swedish national team in 2012. In 2019, he played his 50th game for the national team.
