= Ty Sabin =

American basketball player (born 1994)

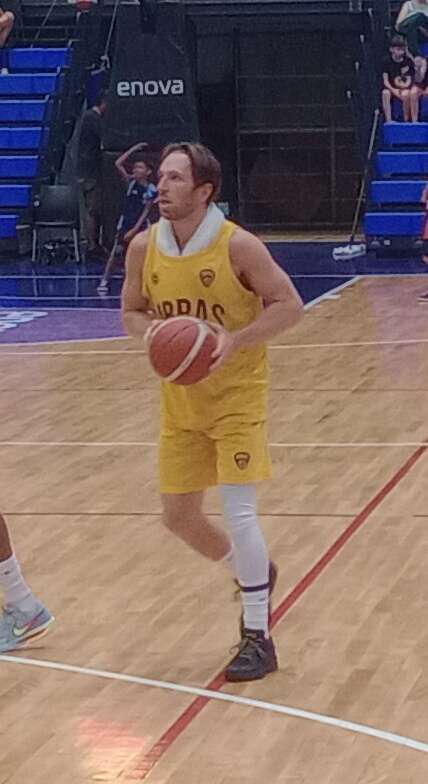
- Sabin playing for Obras Sanitarias in 2025

Personal information
- Born: October 15, 1994 (age 32) New Berlin, Wisconsin, U.S.
- Listed height: 190 cm (6 ft 3 in)
- Listed weight: 86 kg (190 lb)

Career information
- High school: Catholic Memorial (Waukesha, Wisconsin)
- College: Ripon (2013–2017)
- NBA draft: 2017: undrafted
- Playing career: 2017–present
- Position: Guard
- Number: 12

Career history
- 2017–2018: Hørsholm 79ers
- 2018–2019: Básquet Coruña
- 2019–2020: Wetterbygden Stars
- 2020–2021: KR
- 2021–2022: Cestistica Città di San Severo
- 2023: Sella Cento
- 2023–2024: Luiss Roma
- 2024–present: CS Vâlcea 1924

Career highlights
- SBL leading scorer (2020); Serie A2 leading scorer (2021)

Tyler Francis Sabin (born October 15, 1994) is an American professional basketball player. He plays for CS Vâlcea 1924 of Romania.

== College career ==
Sabin played college basketball for the Ripon Red Hawks of Ripon College. He left the school as its leader in career points (2,559), career scoring average (26.1 ppg), career 3-pointers made (283), single-season scoring average (30.7 ppg), single-season points (798) and was tied for fifth in school history for career 3-point percentage (.465) when he left. He was recognized with 2016-17 NABC All-America First Team and D3hoops.com men's All-America First Team honors.

== Professional career ==
Following his college career, Sabin had a pre-draft workout with the Milwaukee Bucks but ultimately went undrafted in the 2017 NBA draft. He later signed with the Hørsholm 79ers of the Danish Basketligaen where he went on to average 16.9 points in 25 games. The following season he played for Básquet Coruña in the Spanish LEB Oro. He saw action in 34 league games for Coruña, averaging 9.1 points per contest.

In June 2019, Sabin signed with Wetterbygden Stars of the Swedish Basketball League. During the 2019–20 season, he led the SBL in scoring (22.2 points per game) and helped the Stars to a 5th-place finish.

Sabin signed with KR of the Úrvalsdeild karla in September 2020. In his debut, he scored a season high 47 points in a 1-point loss against Tindastóll. During the regular season, he averaged 25.6 points, 3.8 rebounds and 4.0 assists per game. On 16 May 2021, he scored a game winning three pointer with 5 seconds left to beat Valur in the first game of its first round playoff series against KR. He reached the semifinals with KR, where they fell short to Keflavík. Sabin averaged 25.3 points a game in eight playoff appearances for KR. With 25.5 points per game over the course of the 2020-21 season, Sabin was the leading scorer of the Úrvalsdeild karla.

In August 2021, Sabin signed with Cestistica Città di San Severo of Italy's Serie A2, Group B. He played for the team until the end of the 2021-22 season in which he was the leading scorer of the Serie A2 (21.6 points a contest).

He started the 2023-24 season at Sella Cento of the Italian A2 league. In November 2023, he moved to fellow A2 team Luiss Roma. Sabin inked a deal with Romanian side CS Vâlcea 1924 in August 2024.
