= Basketettan =

- Country: Sweden
- Confederation: FIBA Europe
- Number of teams: 21
- Level on pyramid: 3
- Promotion to: Superettan
- Current champions: Norrort (2018–19)

Basketettan is the third tier league of professional basketball in Sweden. Until 2017, it was the second-tier league before it was replaced by Superettan. The winner of each Basketettan season is promoted to Superettan.

== Background ==
From 2013, Basketettan was played during Swedish fall with the best teams qualifying for Superettan in the spring. This format lasted until 2017 and since the 2017–18 season, it is the third tier with a ten-team all-season Superettan above as a second tier.

== Teams ==
As of 2021–22

=== North ===
Team	City
AIK	Stockholm
Åkersberga Basket	Åkersberga
Alvik Basket	Stockholm
Aros Basket	Västerås
KFUM Blackeberg	Stockholm
Jämtland Basket U	Östersund
KFUM Lidingö	Lidingö
Luleå Steelers	Luleå
RIG Luleå	Luleå
KFUM Sundsvall	Sundsvall
Umeå BSKT	Umeå

=== South ===
Team	City
Djurgården	Stockholm
Fryshuset Basket	Stockholm
Hammarby IF	Stockholm
Högsbo Basket	Gothenburg
KFUM Kalmar	Kalmar
Malbas	Malmö
BK Marbo	Kinna
Nässjö BF	Nässjö
Norrköpings BF	Norrköping
Södertälje BBK	Södertälje
