= 2014–15 EuroChallenge Group C =

Basketball tournament group stage

Group C of the 2014–15 EuroChallenge consisted of Okapi Aalstar, Bakken Bears, Fraport Skyliners, and Borås Basket. Play began on 4 November and ended on 16 December 2014.

== Teams ==
Draw seed	Team	City	Country	Last appearance	2013–14			Arena	Capacity
Draw seed	Team	City	Country	Last appearance	League	Pos.	Playoffs	Arena	Capacity
I	Okapi Aalstar	Aalst	Belgium	2013–14	Ethias League	5th	RU	Okapi Forum	2,800
II	Bakken Bears	Aarhus	Denmark	2013–14	DBL	1st	C	Vejlby-Risskov Hallen	1,950
III	Fraport Skyliners	Frankfurt	Germany	—	BBL	11th	—	Fraport Arena	5,002
IV	Borås Basket	Borås	Sweden	—	Basketligan	2nd	SF	Boråshallen	3,000

== Standings ==
Pos	Team	Pld	W	L	PF	PA	PD	Pts	OKA	FRA	BOR	BAK
1	(Belgium) Okapi Aalstar (Q)	6	5	1	557	507	+50	11		94–59	119–118	103–100
2	(Germany) Fraport Skyliners (Q)	6	4	2	464	421	+43	10	80–58		70–72	74–64
3	(Sweden) Borås	6	3	3	505	516	−11	9	67–91	72–87		90–70
4	(Denmark) Bakken Bears Aarhus	6	0	6	457	539	−82	6	83–92	61–94	79–86	

(Q) Qualify for Top 16

== Results ==
=== Round 1 ===
4 November 2014

Boxscore

Bakken Bears Aarhus (Denmark)	79–86	(Sweden) Borås Basket
Scoring by quarter: 23–21, 19–21, 29–18, 8–26
Pts: Morten Sahlertz 17; Rebs: Jonas Bergstedt 10; Asts: Nicolai Iversen 8		Pts: James Miller 19; Rebs: Maraker, Haanpää 9 Asts: Adama Darbo 8

Risskov, Denmark
Attendance: 800

4 November 2014

Boxscore

Okapi Aalstar (Belgium)	94–59	(Germany) Fraport Skyliners
Scoring by quarter: 20–17, 38–11, 17–15, 19–16
Pts: Thomas Dreesen 22; Rebs: three players 5 Asts: Jason Clark 6		Pts: Sean Armand 15; Rebs: Danilo Barthel 9 Asts: Richard Williams 4

Aalst, Belgium
Attendance: 1,000

=== Round 2 ===
11 November 2014

Boxscore

Borås Basket (Sweden)	67–91	(Belgium) Okapi Aalstar

Borås, Sweden
Attendance: 1,310

11 November 2014

Boxscore

Fraport Skyliners (Germany)	74–64	(Denmark) Bakken Bears Aarhus

Frankfurt, Germany
Attendance: 1,200

=== Round 3 ===
18 November 2014

Bakken Bears Aarhus (Denmark)	83–92	(Belgium) Okapi Aalstar

19 November 2014

Fraport Skyliners (Germany)	70–72	(Sweden) Borås Basket

=== Round 4 ===
2 December 2014

Borås Basket (Sweden)	90–70	(Denmark) Bakken Bears Aarhus

2 December 2014

Fraport Skyliners (Germany)	80–58	(Belgium) Okapi Aalstar

=== Round 5 ===
9 December 2014

Bakken Bears Aarhus (Denmark)	61–94	(Germany) Fraport Skyliners

9 December 2014

Okapi Aalstar (Belgium)	119–118 (OT)	(Sweden) Borås Basket

=== Round 6 ===
16 December 2014

Borås Basket (Sweden)	72–87	(Germany) Fraport Skyliners

16 December 2014

Okapi Aalstar (Belgium)	103–100	(Denmark) Bakken Bears Aarhus
