= Obol =

Obol may refer to:

- Obol (coin), a type of silver coin used in Ancient Greece
- Obol, an occasional name for the halfpenny (British pre-decimal coin)
- Obol (urban-type settlement), an urban-type settlement in Vitebsk Region, Belarus
- Obol Investment, a Swedish company involved in a major fraud scandal
- Obol Basketball League, former name of the Swedish Basketball League when it signed an agreement with the company
