= Elvar Már Friðriksson =

Icelandic basketball player (born 1994)

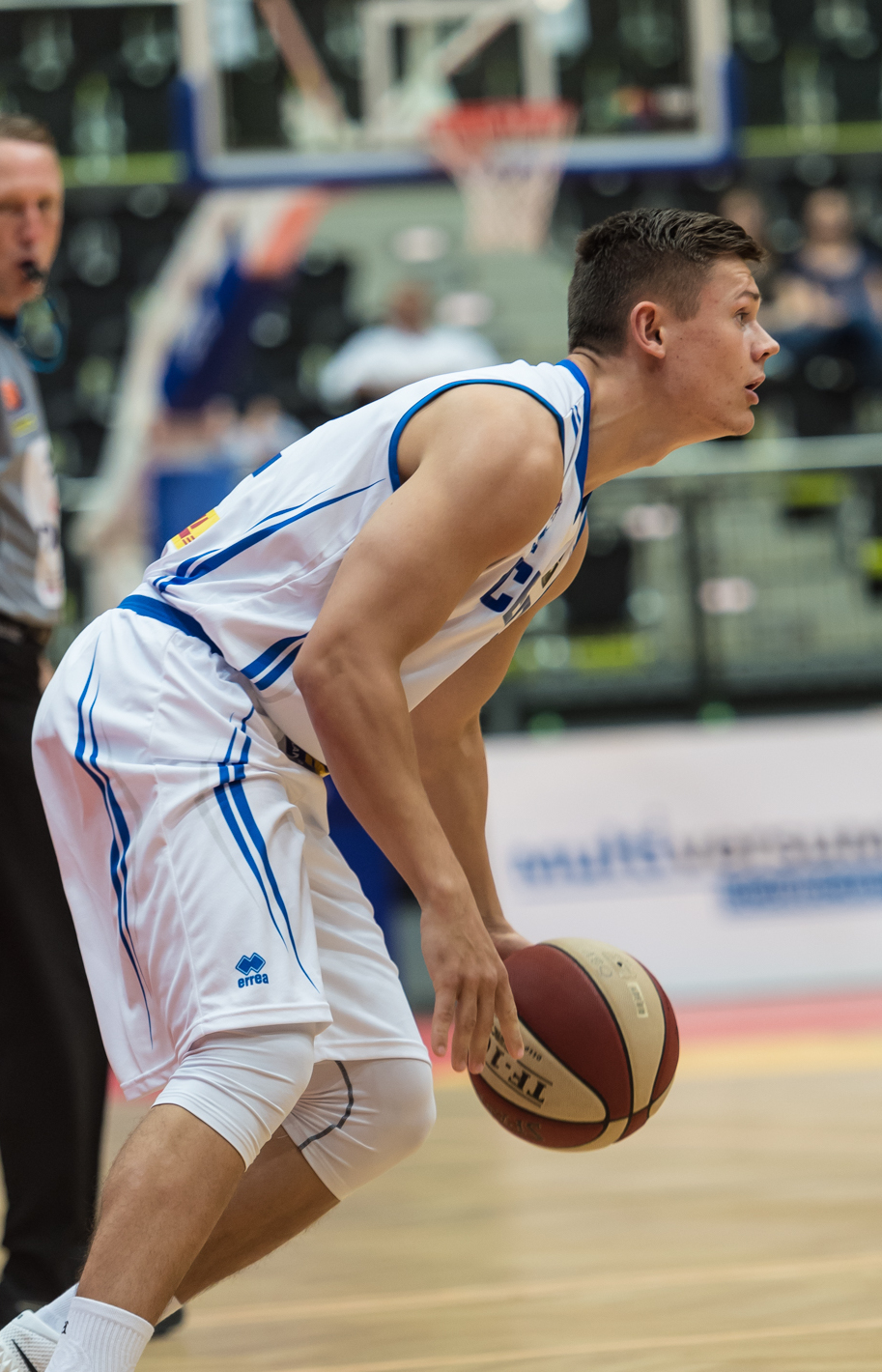
- Elvar Már in 2016 with Iceland

No. 10 – Neptūnas Klaipėda
- Position: Point guard
- League: LKL; EuroCup

Personal information
- Born: 11 November 1994 (age 32)
- Listed height: 183 cm (6 ft 0 in)
- Listed weight: 78 kg (172 lb)

Career information
- College: LIU Brooklyn (2014–2015); Barry (2015–2018)
- Playing career: 2011–present

Career history
- 2011–2015: Njarðvík
- 2018: Denain Voltaire
- 2018–2019: Njarðvík
- 2019–2020: Borås Basket
- 2020–2021: BC Šiauliai
- 2021–2022: Antwerp Giants
- 2022: Derthona Basket
- 2022–2023: Rytas Vilnius
- 2023–2024: PAOK Thessaloniki
- 2024–2025: Maroussi
- 2025–2026: Anwil Włocławek
- 2026: La Laguna Tenerife
- 2026–present: Neptūnas Klaipėda

Career highlights
- FIBA Europe Cup assists leader (2025); 3× Icelandic Male Basketball Player of the Year (2021–2023); Lithuanian League MVP (2021); All-LKL Team (2021); LKL assists leader (2021); Basketligan champion (2020); Basketligan Guard of the Year (2020); 2× Úrvalsdeild Domestic All-First team (2013, 2014); BNXT League assists leader (2022); Basketligan assists leader (2020); 2× SSC Player of the Year (2017, 2018); 2× First-team All-SSC (2017, 2018)
Medals
Men's basketball
Representing Iceland
Games of the Small States of Europe
Bronze medal – third place	2013 Luxembourg	Team
Silver medal – second place	2015 Reykjavík	Team
Bronze medal – third place	2019 Budva	Team

Elvar Már Friðriksson (born 11 November 1994) is an Icelandic professional basketball player for Neptūnas Klaipėda of the Lithuanian Basketball League (LKL) and the EuroCup. He is also a member of the Icelandic national basketball team. He has twice been named to the Icelandic Úrvalsdeild Domestic All-First team as a member of Njarðvík. In 2020, he won the Swedish championship with Borås Basket. In 2021, he was named the Lithuanian Basketball League MVP after leading the league in assists. He was named the Icelandic Male Basketball Player of the Year three times in a row from 2021 to 2023.

== Professional career ==
=== First seasons with Njarðvík ===
Elvar started his playing career with Njarðvík in the Icelandic top-tier Úrvalsdeild karla in 2011, averaging 11.5 points and 4.6 assists during the regular season. He upped his averages to 19.1 points and 4.7 assist the following season and to 21.5 points and 7.2 assists in 2013–2014, being named to the Úrvalsdeild Domestic All-First team both times.

=== Long Island University ===
Following his strong performance, Elvar agreed to join Long Island University where he played alongside Martin Hermannsson with the LIU Sharks basketball team.

=== Barry University ===
The following season, Elvar transferred to Barry University where he played until 2018. In March 2018, he was selected as the Sunshine State Conference Player of the Year for the second consecutive year after averaging 20.0 points and 7.3 assists per game.

=== Denain Voltaire ===
In June 2018, Elvar Már joined Denain Voltaire of the LNB Pro B. On 5 November 2018, it was reported that Denain Voltaire planned to release him to make room on the roster for another signing.

=== Back to Njarðvík ===
After being released by Denain during a roster overhaul, Elvar signed with Njarðvík on 15 November 2018. On 13 December 2018, Elvar posted a triple-double in a victory against Breiðablik with 40 points, 11 rebounds and 12 assists. During the regular season, he averaged 23.1 points and 5.3 assists per game. In the playoffs, the second seeded Njarðvík was unexpectedly knocked out in the first round by ÍR.

=== Borås Basket ===
In June 2019, Elvar signed with Borås Basket of the Swedish Basketligan. In March 2020, he won the Swedish championship after the Swedish Basketball Federation decided to cancel the rest of the 2019–20 season due to the coronavirus outbreak in the country and award Borås the title as the top team at the time of the cancelation. After the season he was named the Basketligan Guard of the Year.

=== BC Šiauliai ===
On 26 July 2020, Elvar signed with BC Šiauliai of the LKL. He was named the Player of the Month for the games played in November 2020 after averaging 18.5 points and 9.5 assists per game. On 21 April 2021, he had 33 points and 11 assists, while shooting a perfect 9-of-9 from the field and 10-of-10 from the free throw line, in a 103–90 victory against BC Pieno žvaigždės. On 7 May, he had 15 points and a season high 17 assists in a double overtime loss against BC Neptūnas. Following the regular season, where he led the league in assists, he was named the Lithuanian Basketball League MVP.

=== Antwerp Giants ===
On 21 July 2021, Elvar signed with Antwerp Giants of the Belgian-Dutch BNXT League. On 16 December 2021, it was announced that he had been named the Icelandic Male Basketball Player of the Year. In February 2021, Antwerp refused an offer from Galatasaray for Elvar.

=== Derthona Basket ===
On 3 April 2022, Elvar joined Derthona Basket.

=== Rytas Vilnius ===
On 11 August 2022, Elvar signed with Rytas Vilnius. In December 2022, he was named the Icelandic Male Basketball Player of the Year for the second straight year. He became a fan favorite with Rytas fans and helped the team to the LKL finals where they lost to BC Žalgiris.

=== PAOK Thessaloniki ===
On 10 July 2023, Elvar signed with PAOK of the Greek Basket League and the Basketball Champions League. In October 2023 he became the third player to achieve a triple double in the history of the Basketball Champions League. He did so in a game against Galatasaray in the first game of the group stages when he had 19 points, 11 rebounds and 10 assists despite battling illness that caused him to throw up before the game and during halftime. He also became the first and so far only player in the competition's history to achieve this feature in an away match.

=== Maroussi ===
On 7 June 2024, Elvar signed with Greek club Maroussi. On 9 February 2025, he set the Greek Basketball League's single game assists record with 17 assists.

=== Anwil Włocławek ===
On July 15, 2025, he signed with Anwil Włocławek of the Polish Basketball League (PLK).

=== La Laguna Tenerife ===
On May 21, 2026, he signed with La Laguna Tenerife of the Liga ACB until the end of the season.

=== Neptūnas Klaipėda ===
On July 6, 2026, Elvar signed one–year contract with Neptūnas Klaipėda of the Lithuanian Basketball League (LKL) and the EuroCup.

== National team career ==
Elvar played 21 games with Iceland's junior national teams from 2010 to 2013.

His first game with the senior national team was in 2013 and he was a member of Iceland's team in Eurobasket 2015 and Eurobasket 2017. Elvar was a member Iceland's team in then Games of the Small States of Europe in 2013 and 2015.

On 20 February 2021, he scored a game winning three pointer with 0.7 seconds left in a 86–84 victory against Luxembourg in the final game of the first round of the 2023 FIBA Basketball World Cup Pre-Qualifiers.

On 13 August 2021, Elvar scored a game high 30 points in a 91–70 victory against Denmark in the 2023 FIBA Basketball World Cup Pre-Qualifiers.

In December 2023, Elvar was named the Icelandic Male Basketball Player of the Year for the third straight year.

== Personal life ==
Elvar is the son of former Icelandic national team player Friðrik Ragnarsson and brother of former Úrvalsdeild point guard Ragnar Helgi Friðriksson.

== Career statistics ==
=== National team ===
Team	Tournament	Pos.	GP	PPG	RPG	APG
Iceland	EuroBasket 2017	24th	5	3.0	1.0	1.4
Iceland	EuroBasket 2025	22nd	5	12.4	2.4	2.6
