= Ernests Kalve =

Latvian basketball player and coach

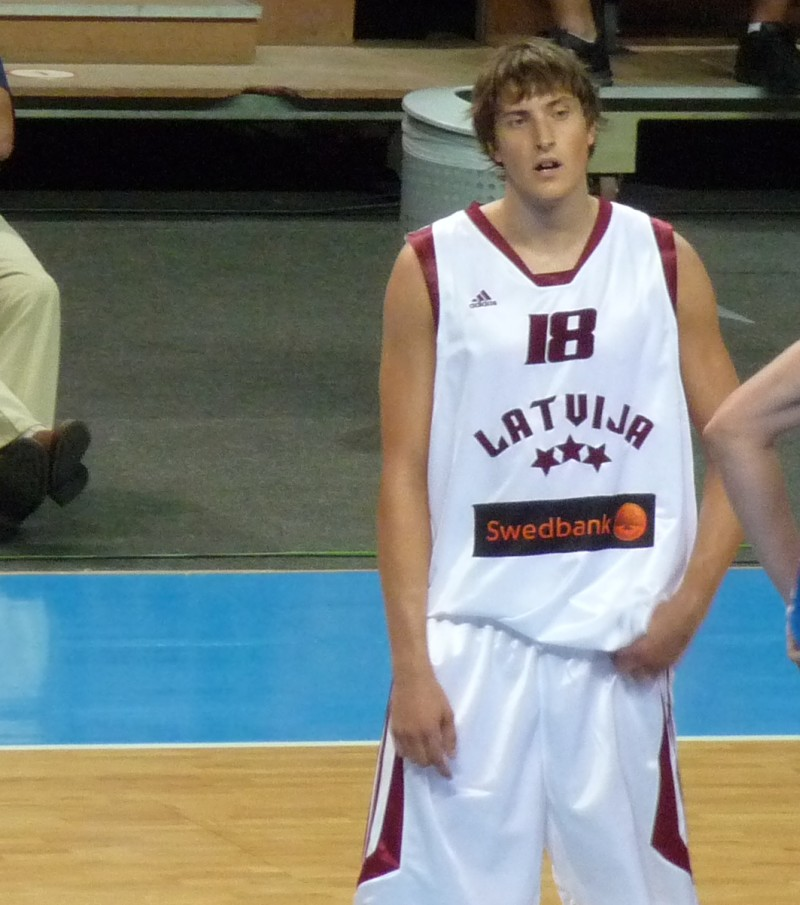

BK Ogre
- Position: Assistant coach
- League: LatEst

Personal information
- Born: April 4, 1987 (age 39) Riga, Latvia
- Listed height: 6 ft 7 in (2.01 m)
- Listed weight: 200 lb (91 kg)

Career information
- NBA draft: 2009: undrafted
- Playing career: 2004–2023
- Coaching career: 2022–present

Career history

Playing
- 2004–2005: Falco/Ķeizarmežs
- 2005–2006: Benetton Treviso
- 2006–2007: Giessen 46ers
- 2007–2009: ASK Riga
- 2009–2010: BK Ventspils
- 2010–2011: BC Nevėžis
- 2011–2012: BK Valmiera
- 2012: Trabzonspor
- 2012–2013: Szolnoki Olaj KK
- 2013: Vanoli Cremona
- 2013–2014: BK Valmiera
- 2014: Barons/LDz
- 2015: Alba Fehérvár
- 2015–2016: Sundsvall Dragons
- 2016–2017: BC Mureș
- 2017–2019: Phoenix Galați
- 2019–2022: Köping Stars
- 2022–2023: BK Ogre

Coaching
- 2022: Köping Stars (assistant)
- 2022–present: BK Ogre (assistant)

Career highlights
- Italian League champion (2006)

Ernests Kalve (born April 4, 1987) is a Latvian professional basketball player and assistant coach for BK Ogre of the Latvian-Estonian Basketball League.

== Professional career ==
Kalve's first team was Falco/Ķeizarmežs in Latvian Amateur Basketball League. He played in U-18 2005 European Championship, where he was the tournament's top scorer. After that championship he signed with the Italian club Benetton Treviso. After a year with Benetton, he moved to the Giessen 46ers, and he then returned to his home country to play for ASK Riga.

Then he played for Trabzonspor Basketball in Turkish Basketball League, and for Szolnoki Olaj KK in Liga ABA.

In October 2013, he returned to Italy, signing for Vanoli Cremona. Kalve was released in December, after some disappointing performances. He returned in Latvia with BK Valmiera.

On August 4, 2015, he signed with Sundsvall Dragons of the Swedish Basketligan.

On August 22, 2016, Kalve signed with Romanian club BC Mureș for the 2016–17 season.

On December 9, 2017, Kalve signed with Romanian club Phoenix Galați.

On November 1, 2019, Kalve signed with Swedish club Köping Stars. He averaged 10.4 points and 4.4 rebounds per game when the Coronavirus-pandemic hit Sweden in March 2020 and the season got cancelled. With Köping Stars being on a third place, they received a bronze medal.

On July 14, 2020, he re-signed with the team.

On June 17, 2021, Köping Stars announced that Kalve had re-signed with the team for the 2021-2022 SBL season both as a player, but would also take the role as assistant coach for the team. He also got the job to coach the clubs B-team in division 2 (fourth highest level). https://kopingstars.se/kalve-ny-assisterande-coach-i-stars-2/

On January 11, 2022, it was known that Kalve would retire as a player and focus on his coaching career.
