= Dimitris Agathangelidis =

Greek-Swedish basketball player (born 1998)

No. 13 – Cazorla Jaén
- Position: Point guard
- League: Liga EBA

Personal information
- Born: 7 March 1998 (age 28) Stockholm, Sweden
- Listed height: 6 ft 1 in (1.85 m)

Career information
- Playing career: 2017–present

Career history
- 2017–2019: Södertälje Kings
- 2019–2020: Cazorla Jaén
- 2021–2022: Gijón Basket

Career highlights
- 2x Swedish League champion (2018, 2019)

Dimitris Agathangelidis (born 7 March 1998) is a Greek-Swedish professional basketball player for Cazorla Jaén of the Liga EBA.
