= Obinna =

- Gender: Male

Origin
- Origin: Igbo
- Meaning: Father's heart
- Region of origin: Igboland

Obinna // is a popular Igbo male name and, occasionally, surname. It means "father's heart".

== Given name ==
- Obinna Anyanwu, (born 1983) Nigerian singer-songwriter, known as Waconzy
- Obinna Chidoka (born 1974), Nigerian politician
- Obinna Agbodike, Nigerian-born Engineer, Author, Researcher
- Obinna Ekezie (born 1975), Nigerian basketball player
  - Obinna Ekezie Jr. (born 2008), Nigerian basketball player, son of the above
- Obinna Eregbu (born 1969), Nigerian athlete
- Obinna Eze (born 1998), Nigerian American football player
- Obinna Metu (born 1988), Nigerian athlete
- Obinna Nwachukwu (born 1992), Nigerian footballer
- Obinna Nwaneri (born 1982), Nigerian footballer
- Obinna Nwosu (born 1971), Nigerian basketball player, better known as Julius Nwosu
- Obinna Oleka (born 1993), American basketball player
- Obinna Chibueze (born 1995), American musician, better known as Shaboozey

== Surname ==
- Mikel John Obi (born John Michael Nchekwube Obinna in 1987), Nigerian footballer playing for Chelsea F.C.
- Eric Obinna Chukwunyelu (born 1982), Nigerian footballer playing for St. George's F.C.
- Victor Nsofor Obinna (born 1987), Nigerian footballer playing for SV Darmstadt 98
- Ezebuiro Obinna (1947–1999), Nigerian singer

== See also ==
- Obina, nickname of Brazilian footballer Manoel de Brito Filho
