= Craig Victor II =

American basketball player (born 1995)

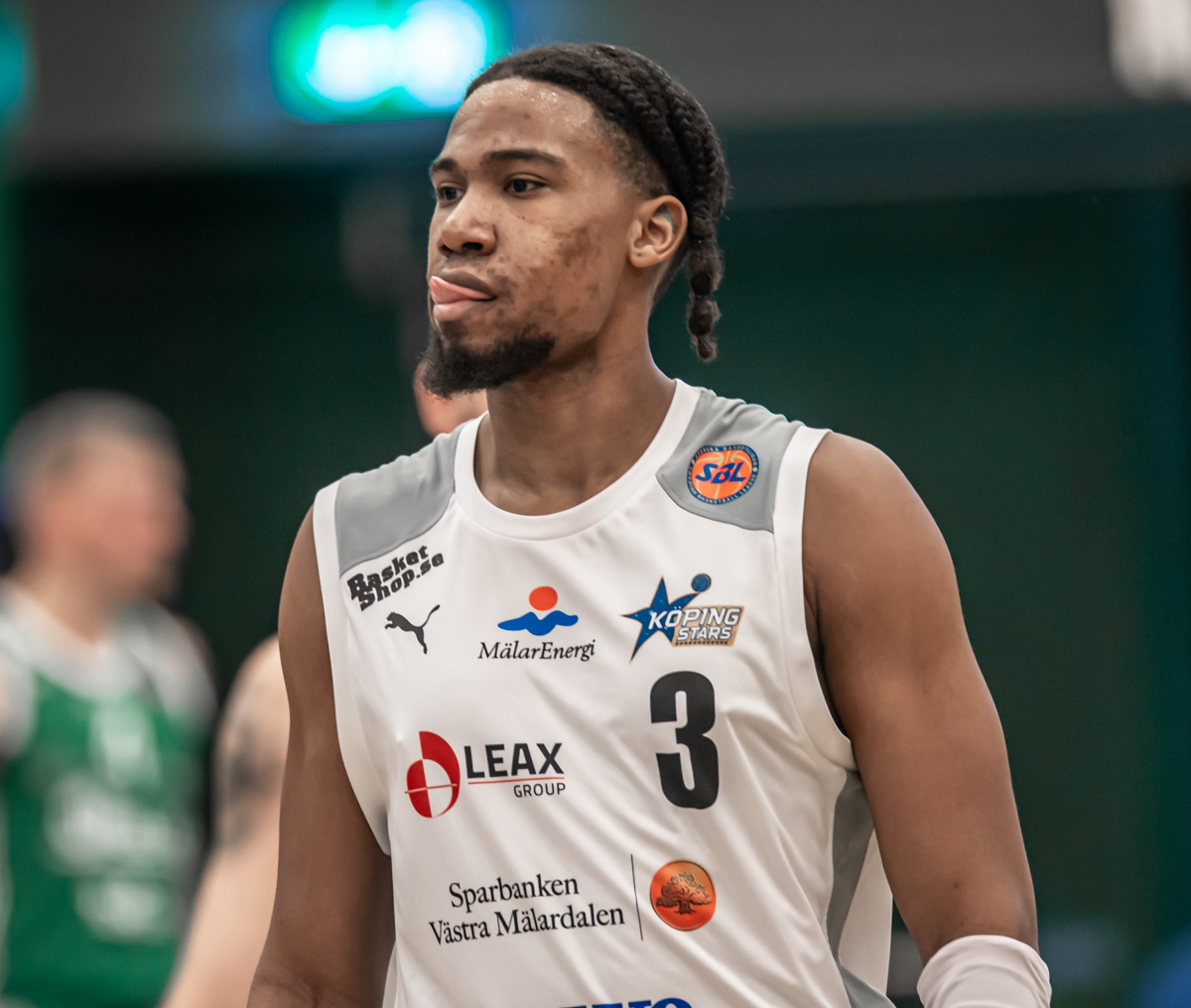
- Victor playing with Köping Stars in 2021

Aias Evosmou
- Position: Small forward
- League: Greek A2 Basket League

Personal information
- Born: February 27, 1995 (age 31) New Orleans, Louisiana
- Listed height: 6 ft 7 in (2.01 m)
- Listed weight: 225 lb (102 kg)

Career information
- High school: Findlay Prep (Henderson, Nevada)
- College: Arizona (2014–2015); LSU (2015–2017)
- NBA draft: 2017: undrafted
- Playing career: 2017–present

Career history
- 2017–2018: Rio Grande Valley Vipers
- 2019–2020: Djurgårdens IF Basket
- 2020: Sloboda Tuzla
- 2020–2021: Köping Stars
- 2021–2022: Jindřichův Hradec
- 2022–2023: Psychiko
- 2023–present: Aias Evosmou

Craig Victor II (born February 27, 1995) is an American professional basketball player for the Aias Evosmou of the Greek A2 Basket League. He played college basketball for the Arizona Wildcats and the LSU Tigers.

== High school and college career ==
After averaging 13.7 points and 8.6 boards a game for Findlay Prep in 2013–14, Victor spent his college freshman year at the University of Arizona, compiling averages of 3.1 points and 1.1 rebounds in eight contests wearing a Wildcat uniform.

He transferred to LSU in January 2015 and had to sit out until the end of the 2015 fall semester before making his debut for the Tigers in December 2015. Until the remainder of the 2015–16 season, he saw the court in 25 contests, averaging 11.5 points and 5.6 rebounds for LSU.

Victor missed the three opening games of the 2016–17 campaign due to suspension (violation of team rules) and then averaged 10.5 points as well as 7.6 rebounds in eight games.

== Professional career ==
In April 2017, Victor declared for the 2017 NBA draft, but was not selected by any team. He then joined the Rio Grande Valley Vipers of the NBA G League for the 2017–18 season. He spent the 2019–20 season in Sweden with Djurgårdens IF Basket, averaging 27 points and 11.4 rebounds per game.

On August 12, 2020, Victor signed with Sloboda Tuzla of the Basketball Championship of Bosnia and Herzegovina and the ABA League Second Division. On October 8, Victor parted ways with the team. The same day, he signed with the Köping Stars in Sweden.
