= Zarko Jukic =

Danish basketball player (born 1993)

Ármann
- Position: Small forward
- League: Úrvalsdeild karla

Personal information
- Born: 28 July 1993 (age 33) Copenhagen, Denmark
- Listed height: 201 cm (6 ft 7 in)
- Listed weight: 95 kg (209 lb)

Career information
- Playing career: 2011–present

Career history
- 2011–2014: Hørsholm 79ers
- 2014–2015: KFUM Nässjö
- 2015–2016: Norrköping Dolphins
- 2016–2017: Ourense
- 2017–2018: Newcastle Eagles
- 2018–2019: Albacete Basket
- 2019–2020: Team FOG Næstved
- 2021: KR
- 2021–2022: CD Povoa
- 2022: KFUM Nässjö
- 2023: CB Cornellà
- 2023–2025: Íþróttafélag Reykjavíkur
- 2025–present: Ármann

Career highlights
- Danish League All-Star (2013, 2014)

Zarko Jukic (Serbo-Croatian: Žarko Jukić; born 28 July 1993) is a Danish professional basketball player and a member of the Danish national team.

== Club career ==
Jukic started his career in Denmark with the Hørsholm 79ers in 2011 and played there until 2014. The following two seasons he played in Sweden, first with KFUM Nässjö and then with the Norrköping Dolphins. During the 2016–17 season, he played for Ourense in the Spanish second-tier LEB Oro. The next three seasons he played for the Newcastle Eagles, Albacete Basket and Team FOG Næstved.

On 20 February 2021, Jukic signed with reigning Icelandic champions KR.

In December 2025, he signed with Ármann.

== National team career ==
Jukic has been a member of the Danish national team.
