= Ockelbo BBK =

- Leagues: Superettan
- Founded: 1969
- Arena: Bionärhallen
- Location: Ockelbo, Sweden

Ockelbo BBK is a basketball club in Ockelbo, Sweden. The club was established in 1969 and the women's team played in Elitserien between 1995 and 1999. The men's team qualified for the Swedish Basketball League in 2003. Suffering from economic problems in 2006, the club applied for bankruptcy to the Gävle District Court on 13 February 2007. The men's team first played the two remaining games of the regular season.
