= Djurgårdens IF Basket =

Djurgården
- Leagues: Basketligan
- Founded: 2015
- Arena: Brännkyrkahallen
- Capacity: 500
- Location: Stockholm, Sweden
- Championships: 1 Superettan
- Website: difbasket.se

Djurgårdens IF Basket, also known as simply Djurgården, is a Swedish basketball club based in Stockholm. It is the basketball section of the Djurgårdens IF multi-sports club, established in 1891.

The Djurgården basketball team started in 2015. In 2019, Djurgården won the Superettan, Sweden's second tier league, and thus became eligible for promotion to the first tier Basketligan for the first time. In March 2019, the promotion was confirmed by the federation.

Djurgården played their premiere in Basketligan against Jämtland Basket in Kungliga tennishallen, Stockholm, in front of 4,000 people and won 108–102. After one season in Basketligan, Djurgården withdrew from the league in May 2020.

== Honours ==
- Superettan
  - Winners (1): 2018–19

== Notable players ==
- (Netherlands) Bryan Alberts (1 season: 2019–20)
- (Democratic Republic of the Congo) Yannick Anzuluni (1 season: 2019–20)
- (United Kingdom) Dee Ayuba (2 season: 2016–18)
- (United States) Obinna Oleka (1 season: 2019–20)
- (Serbia) Lazar Radosavljević (3 season: 2016–2017, 18–20)
- (United States) Craig Victor II (1 season: 2019–20)
- (United States) Aaron Pervis Williams (1 season: 2019–20)
