= Obol Investment =

Obol company logo.

Obol Investment was an apparent Swedish company involved in fund managing and sponsoring sport events. In 2006, it signed a 15-year sponsorship deal with the Swedish Basketball Federation that resulted in the renaming of Basketligan ("the Basketball league") to Obol Basketball League. It was later revealed by independently working journalists at Norrbottens-Kuriren and Sveriges Radio's Kaliber, an investigative journalism program, that the company did not have a permits to conduct business in Sweden and that the company seemed to have no traceable fund assets. Or at least not in the amounts claimed by the company spokespersons ($1–15 billion US Dollars).

== The Obol affair ==
According to Radio Sweden's domestic program Kaliber on 3 December 2006, the company "Obol Investment" doesn't exist, and doesn't have the necessary permits to manage funds in Sweden, Switzerland or any other country. It was also revealed that the focal point of Obol, the charismatic entrepreneur Bo Johansson (born 1962 in Malmberget), had been supplying false information about the circumstances of his own upbringing as well as the origins of Obol itself. Johansson claimed that he was orphaned when he was only 16 when his parents actually died a few years apart in his mid 20s. The founder and owner of Obol, an Englishman known as "Sir Brownleigh". Obol has been marketed as a highly internationalized business with vast sums (up to 15 billion US dollars) in investment funds, about which there seems to be no public information. Despite this, the company's website is hosted from a server in Köping, Sweden.

In press releases on their webpage from 4–9 December 2006, Obol Investment's two main representatives, Bo Johansson and Jan Saradlic, denounced the criticism in the media as a "journalistic frontal attack", "a nightmare" and "a mass hunt/slaughter of Obol", as well as stating that they are looking into possibilities of suing for libel. "Rightful and appropriate" criticism about withholding of information has been admitted, however, and all investments in the Obol Investment Concept fund were to be repaid.

As of 12 January 2007, Obol had repeatedly avoided attending meetings with Finansinspektionen, the agency charged with supervising the Swedish financial market, to clear up any suspicions of illegal activities. Finansinspektionen is currently conducting an investigation whether Obol and its owners have been pursuing business ventures that would require permits.

Bo Johansson returned to Sweden in 2019 under a different last name. He claims that a member of the company tasked with returning funds to investors sent it to a relative in Croatia.
