= Borås Basket =

- Leagues: Swedish Basketball League
- Founded: September 1952; 73 years ago
- Arena: Boråshallen
- Capacity: 3,000
- Team colors: Black, Orange
- Head coach: Henrik Svensson
- Championships: 2 Swedish Championship
- Website: www.borasbasket.se
Home	Away

Borås Basket is a professional basketball club based in the Swedish town of Borås. The club was founded in 1952 and currently competes in the Swedish Basketball League (SBL), the country's premier league.

Borås has played in European competitions multiple times in its history; in 1995, 1996 and 2000 it played in the FIBA Korac Cup. In 2014 Borås returned to Europe when it entered the EuroChallenge.

== History ==
In the 1999–2000 season, Borås was personally sponsored by National Basketball Association (NBA) player Magic Johnson and was named "Magic M7 Borås". Johnson himself played 5 games for the club between October and January that season. Johnson joined the roster and was undefeated in five games with the team. Johnson also became a co-owner of the club; however, the project failed after one season and the club was forced into reconstruction.

Since 2007, Borås is again active in the Basketligan, the highest tier of Swedish basketball.

In the 2019–20 season, Borås won its first Swedish championship under special circumstances. Due to the COVID-19 pandemic, the season was ended prematurely and the team won the championship based on its first place in the regular season.

== Honours ==
Swedish Basketball League

- Champions (2): 2019–20 (Note: The 2019–20 Swedish Basketball League was cancelled prematurely due to the COVID-19 pandemic. Therefore, Borås was named champion based on the standings after just 33 games in the regular season.), 2025-26

== Season by season ==
Season	Tier	League	Pos.	European competitions		
2010–11	1	Basketligan	7th			
2011–12	1	Basketligan	4th			
2012–13	1	Basketligan	5th			
2013–14	1	Basketligan	3rd			
2014–15	1	Basketligan	3rd	3 EuroChallenge	RS	3–3
2015–16	1	Basketligan	4th	3 FIBA Europe Cup	R32	5–8
2016–17	1	Basketligan	5th			
2017–18	1	Basketligan	4th	4 FIBA Europe Cup	QR1	0–2
2018–19	1	Basketligan	2nd			
2019–20	1	SBL	1st	4 FIBA Europe Cup	QR1	0–2
2020–21	1	SBL	5th			
2021–22	1	SBL	5th			
2022–23	1	SBL	2nd			
2023–24	1	SBL	2nd	4 FIBA Europe Cup	QT	1–1
2024–25	1	SBL	2nd			
2025–26	1	SBL	1st			

== Players ==
=== Current roster ===
Note: Flags indicate national team eligibility at FIBA-sanctioned events. Players may hold other non-FIBA nationalities not displayed.

Borås Basket roster
Players
Coaches

Pos.	No.	Nat.	Name
PG	1	(Sweden)	Johansson, Ludvig
PG	2	(Sweden)	Thuresson, Daniel
PG	4	(United States)	Hilliard IV, Nimrod
PG	5	(Sweden)	Person, Andreas
G/F	6	(Sweden)	Brändmark, John
G/F	8	(Sweden)	Andersson, Fredrik
G	10	(Iceland)	Sigurdarson, Jakob
F	11	(Sweden)	Gunnarsson, Simon
C	15	(Sweden)	Palm, Michael
C	21	(United States)	Smith, Jyles
PF	31	(United States)	Bisping, Brett
F	42	(Croatia)	Mornar, Marin

Head coach

(Sweden) Henrik Svensson

Assistant coach(es)

(Sweden) Henrik Carlsson
(Sweden) Johan Peroti

Legend

- (C) Team captain
- Injured

- Roster
Updated: 8 July 2021

=== Notable players ===
Note: Flags indicate national team eligibility at FIBA-sanctioned events. Players may hold other non-FIBA nationalities not displayed.

Criteria

To appear in this section a player must have either:

- Set a club record or won an individual award while at the club
- Played at least one official international match for their national team at any time
- Played at least one official NBA match at any time.

- (United States) Magic Johnson
- (Iceland) Elvar Már Friðriksson
- (United States) Greg Graham
- (Iceland) Jakob Sigurðarson
- (Australia) Michael Kingma
- (Italy) Ryan Zamroz
- (Finland) Samuel Haanpää
- (Finland) Roope Ahonen
