= Superettan (basketball) =

- Organising body: Swedish Basketball Federation
- Founded: 2017; 9 years ago
- First season: 2017–18
- Country: Sweden
- Confederation: FIBA Europe
- Number of teams: 14
- Level on pyramid: 2
- Promotion to: Basketligan
- Relegation to: Basketettan
- Current champions: Huddinge (1st title) (2025–26)
- President: Björn Göransson
- TV partners: SEH TV
- Website: superettanherr.se
- 2025–26 season

Location of teams in the 2024–25 Superettan
Location of Stockholm teams during the 2024-25 season

Superettan is the second-tier league of men's professional basketball in Sweden. The league was established in 2017 and replaced the Basketettan as the second level. Köping Stars was the inaugural champion. The winners of Superettan are promoted to Basketligan. Since the 2021–22 season there has been a playoffs after the end of the regular season. For the seasons prior, the winner of the regular season was crowned superettan champion.

== Current teams ==
The clubs for the 2024–25 season are:

Team	City	Venue	Capacity
AIK	Solna	Vasalundshallen	N/A
Åkersberga	Åkersberga	Åkersberga sporthall	340
Alvik	Alvik	Åkeshovshallen	1,500
Aros	Västerås	Fryxellska hallen	N/A
Blackeberg	Vällingby	Vällingbyhallen	N/A
Djurgården	Stockholm	Brännkyrkahallen	500
Fryshuset	Stockholm	Fryshuset Sporthall	1,000
Huddinge	Huddinge	Edbohallen	N/A
IK Eos	Lund	Eoshallen	350
Malbas	Malmö	Heleneholms Sporthall	N/A
Ockelbo BBK	Ockelbo	Kuxahallen	840
Sloga Uppsala	Uppsala	USIF Arena	N/A
Tureberg	Sollentuna	Sollentuna Sporthall	320
Wetterbygden	Huskvarna	Huskvarna Sporthall	422

== Playoff format ==
Quarterfinals
1	1st place reg. season	A	H
8	8th place reg. season	H	A
4	4th place reg. season	A	H
5	5th place reg. season	H	A
3	3rd place reg. season	A	H
6	6th place reg. season	H	A
2	2nd place reg. season	A	H
7	7th place reg. season	H	A

Semifinals
Winner QF1	A	H
Winner QF4	H	A
Winner QF3	A	H
Winner QF2	H	A

Finals
Winner SF1	H	A	H
Winner SF2	A	H	H

The quarterfinals and semifinals are determined in two games, one home and one away, with the top seeded team starting away. The finals is played in a best-of-three series, alternating between home and away games, with the top seeded team starting at home.

== Champions ==
Season	Champions	Runners-up	Third place
2017–18	Köping Stars	Wetterbydgen Stars	Djurgårdens IF
2018–19	Djurgårdens IF	Alvik	IK Eos
2019–20	Cancelled due to the COVID-19 pandemic in Sweden		
2020–21	Cancelled due to the COVID-19 pandemic in Sweden		
2021–22	Uppsala Basket	Kalmar	Högsbo Basket
2022–23	Helsingborg	Eskilstuna	IK Eos, Norrort
2023–24	Högsbo Basket	Sloga Uppsala	AIK, Fryshuset
2024–25	Sloga Uppsala	Wetterbygden	Fryshuset, Malbas
2025–26	Huddinge	Eskilstuna	Alviks, Djurgårdens IF

== Records ==
=== Most points in a game ===
- 50 by Erkan Inan, AIK Basket (vs. IK Eos) on January 22, 2022
