= Gothia Basket =

- Founded: 1958
- Dissolved: 2010
- History: Högsbo BK (1958-1993); Kärcher Hisings-Kärra BBK (1993-95); New Wave Sharks (1995-2006); Gothia Basket (2006-2010)
- Arena: Gothia Arena
- Capacity: 1,000
- Location: Gothenburg, Sweden
Home	Away

Gothia Basket was a Swedish basketball club, based in Gothenburg. The team played in the Basketligan from 2007 till 2010.

== Honours ==
Swedish Basketball League

- Winners (1): 1995–96
