= Malbas =

- Leagues: Basketettan (men's); Basketettan Dam (women's)
- Founded: 1969; 57 years ago as Malmö BF
- History: SLG Oresund (2001–2004); Malbas (2004–present)
- Arena: Heleneholms Sporthall
- Location: Malmö, Sweden
- Team colors: White, Black, Orange
- President: Marcus Horning
- Head coach: Rade Vojnovic (men's); Joakim Källman (women's)
- Championships: None
- Website: http://www.malbas.se

Malbas is a professional basketball based in Malmö, Sweden. The club plays in the Superettan, which is the second tier of basketball in the country.

== Teams ==
=== Current roster ===
==== Men's ====
Note: Flags indicate national team eligibility at FIBA-sanctioned events. Players may hold other non-FIBA nationalities not displayed.

Malbas roster
Players
Coaches

| Pos. | No. | Nat. | Name | Ht. | Age |
|---|---|---|---|---|---|
| PG | 1 | (Antigua and Barbuda) (United States) | Fraser, Jermelle | 1.86 m (6 ft 1 in) | 38 – 20 August 1987 |
| G | 2 | (Sweden) | Sjöberg, Sebastian | 1.80 m (5 ft 11 in) | 26 – 18 April 2000 |
| G | 3 | (Sweden) | Buzuk, Robert | 1.87 m (6 ft 2 in) | 25 – 9 July 2000 |
| G | 7 | (Kosovo) | Kelmeni, Bardhosh | 1.95 m (6 ft 5 in) | 28 – 16 January 1998 |
| F | 8 | (Sweden) | Alavuk, Stefan | 2.01 m (6 ft 7 in) | 27 – 9 June 1998 |
| PG | 9 | (Sweden) | Sjöström, Lukas | 1.80 m (5 ft 11 in) | 27 – 25 May 1998 |
| G | 10 | (Sweden) | Hagberg, Kasper | 1.85 m (6 ft 1 in) | 27 – 30 October 1998 |
| G | 12 | (Sweden) | Hasakovic, Dino | 1.87 m (6 ft 2 in) | 29 – 17 March 1997 |
| G | 15 | (Sweden) | Boakye, Gerald | 1.87 m (6 ft 2 in) | 28 – 24 June 1997 |
| PF | 21 | (Sweden) | Eriksson, Cristoffer | 2.00 m (6 ft 7 in) | 26 – 1 July 1999 |
| G | 23 | (Sweden) | Rozic, Luka | 1.99 m (6 ft 6 in) | 28 – 6 February 1998 |
| F | 45 | (Sweden) | Claesson, Gustav | 1.97 m (6 ft 6 in) | 28 – 30 July 1997 |

Head coach

- (Serbia) Rade Vojnovic

Legend

- (C) Team captain
- Injured

- Roster
Updated: 18 December 2017

==== Women's ====
Note: Flags indicate national team eligibility at FIBA-sanctioned events. Players may hold other non-FIBA nationalities not displayed.

Malbas roster
Players
Coaches

| Pos. | No. | Nat. | Name | Ht. | Age |
|---|---|---|---|---|---|
| G | 4 | (Sweden) | Bojar, Veda | 1.72 m (5 ft 8 in) | 29 – 10 June 1996 |
| G | 5 | (Sweden) | Henriks, Sofia | 1.70 m (5 ft 7 in) | 31 – 25 September 1994 |
| F | 6 | (Sweden) | Bäcklin, Linda | 1.75 m (5 ft 9 in) | 28 – 13 March 1998 |
| F | 8 | (Sweden) | Berggren, Cecilia | 1.81 m (5 ft 11 in) |
| G | 9 | (Sweden) | Perry, Emma | 1.68 m (5 ft 6 in) | 28 – 19 January 1998 |
| G | 10 | (Sweden) | Törnkvist, Ida | 1.72 m (5 ft 8 in) | 28 – 10 February 1998 |
| F | 11 | (Sweden) | Svensson, Hanna | 1.74 m (5 ft 9 in) | 31 – 14 June 1994 |
| F | 12 | (Sweden) | Almqvist, Andrea Eir | 1.74 m (5 ft 9 in) | 26 – 19 October 1999 |
| C | 13 | (Sweden) | Raflund, Jonna | 1.91 m (6 ft 3 in) |
| G/F | 14 | (Sweden) | Svensson, Evelina | 1.71 m (5 ft 7 in) | 34 – 16 March 1992 |
| G/F | 15 | (Sweden) | Petrov, Katarina | 1.78 m (5 ft 10 in) |
| C | 16 | (Sweden) | Boqvist, Tova | 1.84 m (6 ft 0 in) | 27 – 2 December 1998 |

Head coach

- (Sweden) Joakim Källman

Assistant coach(es)

- (Sweden) Puja Shahbanil

Legend

- (C) Team captain
- Injured

- Roster
Updated: 30 June 2023
