= Uppsala Basket =

- Leagues: SBL
- Founded: 1960; 66 years ago
- Arena: Fyrishov
- Capacity: 3,000
- Location: Uppsala, Sweden
Home	Away

Uppsala Basket is a Swedish basketball club based in Uppsala. The team plays in the Swedish Basketball League (SBL), the first tier in Sweden. The club was founded in 1960 and plays it home games at Fyrishov. Uppsala is best known for its talent development, and having a unique cooperation with basketball academies.

== Honours ==
Basketligan

- Runner-up (1): 2014–15

== Results ==
Season	Tier	League	Pos.
2012–13	1	Basketligan	3rd
2013–14	1	Basketligan	4th
2014–15	1	Basketligan	2nd
2015–16	1	Basketligan	7th
2016–17	1	Basketligan	4th
2017–18	1	Basketligan	7th
2018–19	1	Basketligan	10th
2019–20	4	Fourth division	2nd
2020–21	2	Superettan	3rd
2021–22	2	Superettan	1st
2022–23	1	Basketligan	9th
2023–24	1	Basketligan	7th
2024–25	1	Basketligan	5th

== Current roster ==
Note: Flags indicate national team eligibility at FIBA-sanctioned events. Players may hold other non-FIBA nationalities not displayed.

Uppsala Basket roster
Players
Coaches

Pos.	No.	Nat.	Name	Ht.	Wt.	Age
F	0	(United States)	Hinton, Jalyn	1.98 m (6 ft 6 in)	91 kg (201 lb)	28 – 6 August 1998
G	1	(Sweden)	Mansson, Jacob	1.99 m (6 ft 6 in)	91 kg (201 lb)	24 – 5 June 2002
F/C	3	(Sweden)	Jadersten, Henrik	2.08 m (6 ft 10 in)	109 kg (240 lb)	31 – 18 March 1995
G	4	(United States)	Shepherd, Jordan	1.93 m (6 ft 4 in)	86 kg (190 lb)	29 – 4 March 1997
G	5	(Sweden)	Friberg, Lukas	1.90 m (6 ft 3 in)	82 kg (181 lb)	31 – 7 September 1995
G	6	(Sweden)	Grant, Kevin	1.91 m (6 ft 3 in)	85 kg (187 lb)	32 – 22 April 1994
PG	7	(Sweden)	Sanne, Tom	1.84 m (6 ft 0 in)	80 kg (176 lb)	24 – 4 September 2002
SG	8	(Sweden)	Delryd, Melker	1.96 m (6 ft 5 in)	86 kg (190 lb)	23 – 24 March 2003
G/F	10	(Sweden)	Zekovic, Alan	1.98 m (6 ft 6 in)	90 kg (198 lb)	28 – 19 August 1998
SF	13	(Sweden)	Larsson, Niklas	1.99 m (6 ft 6 in)	89 kg (196 lb)	32 – 28 April 1994
C	31	(Sweden)	Axelsson, Mikael	2.08 m (6 ft 10 in)	102 kg (225 lb)	32 – 29 September 1994
SG	32	(United States)	Mathis, Anthony	1.93 m (6 ft 4 in)	80 kg (176 lb)	29 – 23 November 1996
F/C	34	(Croatia)	Kutic, Nemanja	2.06 m (6 ft 9 in)	100 kg (220 lb)	23 – 11 December 2002

Head coach

- (Greece) Panagiotis Nikolaidis

Assistant coach(es)

- (Cyprus) Dimitris Aristotelous
- (Sweden) Leif Ibrahim
- (Sweden) Mathias Rutegaard

Legend

- (C) Team captain
- (DC) Dual citizenship
- (I) Import player
- Injured

- Roster
Updated: December 2, 2022

=== Depth chart ===
Pos.	Starting 5	Bench 1	Bench 2
C	Henrik Jadersten	Mikael Axelsson
PF	Jalyn Hinton	Nemanja Kutic	Jacob Mansson
SF	Niklas Larsson	Alen Zekovic
SG	Anthony Mathis	Melker Delryd	Kevin Grant
PG	Jordan Shepherd	Lukas Friberg	Tom Sanne

== Notable players ==
- (United Kingdom) Dee Ayuba (1 season: 2013–14)
- (United States) Thomas Jackson (6 seasons: 2003–04, 2006–09, 2012–15)
- (Sweden) Alexander Lindqvist
- (United States) Anthony Mathis
