= Södertälje BBK =

Swedish basketball club

- Nickname: Kings
- Leagues: Swedish Basketball League
- Founded: 17 July 1968; 57 years ago
- History: Södertälje BBK (1968–present); Södertälje Kings (1995–2020)
- Arena: Täljehallen
- Capacity: 2,000
- Location: Södertälje, Sweden
- Head coach: Ludwig Degernäs
- Championships: 12 Swedish Championships
- Website: sbbk.se (in Swedish)
Home	Away

Södertälje Basketbollklubb, often abbreviated to SBBK, is a Swedish professional basketball club based in Södertälje. The city is located in Eastern Södermanland, 34 km south of Stockholm. Its men's team plays in the Swedish Basketball League (SBL) and has won the national championship 12 times, which makes it the most successful team in Swedish basketball. The team's home arena is the Täljehallen, which has a capacity of 2,000 people. From 1995 until 2020, the men's team was named Södertälje Kings.

== History ==
=== The YMCA period ===
In 1960 the basketball arrived in Mariekällskolan. It was the P.E. Teacher Lennart Carlqvist who introduced the sport to a group of boys. 2 years later in 1962 the boys contacted KFUM Södertälje (YMCA) to ask them to start a basketball section in their organisation. In 1963 the boys were allowed to register the basketball club KFUM Södertäle with the Swedish Basketball Federation (SBBF). On January 21 they became members of SBBF.

The first coach was Enno Laus who had played in Estonia and the training was starting. In April the same year they were competing in the SKFUM Championships. The record was 2 losses to KFUM Göteborg (46-11) and to KFUM Sunne (22-31). The first player to score was Per Lindstén. The training continued and after a couple of pre-season wins in the summer they wanted to play in a higher league (Div. 2). And because team Solbacka had left the league the SBBF invited Södertälje.

When it was time to play in a league the team had to wear team jerseys and after discussion decided to follow Södertälje IF and wear white and green. It all went well and with the new jerseys they won the first game of the season against KFUM Eskilstuna (54-22).

1963-1964 they started a women's team, which started to compete in a league a couple of years later.

=== The SBBK period ===
In 1968 KFUM decided to shut down the basketball section due partly to economic problems and a bit too wild parties. The deficit after the season 1967-1968 was 2889 kr (300 US-dollars). The youths gathered in the KFUM club house to find a way to save the basketball in Södertälje. A new organisation was founded and was called Södertälje Basketboll Klubb (SBBK). Benny Johansson was the founder. Benny wrote a letter to his 30 players asking if basketball should continue or not. He got 27 positive answers.

On 6 August 1968 KFUM held a meeting where they closed down the basketball section. Later that night SBBK, which it was called from the start, had a meeting where they gathered 25 players and decided that they would call themselves SBBK. They announced Benny Johannson as chairman, Peter Sund as cashier and May Ohlsson as secretary. KFUM's administration supplied some used equipment including a Hippo - the men's teams mascot.

The development is now increasing rapidly. The women's team plays its first season in Elitserien (The elites league) 1971 and the men's team in 1973. After falling out of the league after the first season the team climbed back again. 1972 the SDV was founded and 400 young players enrolled to the organization the first week.

In 1977 the women's team won its first championship, the first of eight in a row. The dominating players of the team were Ann-Marie Wikner, Britt-Marie Andersson and Kicki Johansson. That same year, the men's team, Södertälje Kings, lost in the final against Alvik, but the game was watched by 6,414 people (a new record) in Scaniarinken. In 1978 the men's team won its first gold after beating Alvik 3 games to 2. (Game 5 in a packed Eriksdalshall).

Another important part of SBBK's history is when Täljehallen was opened in 1984 and the team got access to three basketball courts and stands. A facility with a capacity of 2000 people.

=== Highlights of the club's history ===
- 1962 - A group of boys starts to play basketball in Mariekällskolan in Södertälje. The P.E. teacher introduces the sport in a city known as the "Hockey town"
- 1963 – The boys contact KFUM in Södertälje and they started a basketball section. KFUM participated in the series of Division 2 (Södra Svealand)
- 1966 – KFUM starts a women's team which competes in the series as well.
- 1968 - KFUM shut down its organization, including the basketball section. The players in Södertälje founded Södertälje Basketboll Klubb (SBBK) on 17 July 1968
- 1970 – The women's team wins Division 1 and advances to elitserien where they play the 1970/71 season. They finished last and moves down to Division 1 again.
- 1972 – SBBK starts it youth organisation. SDV. 400 players sign up the first week.
- 1972 – The men's team advances to Elitserien but finished last and is moved down to Division 1.
- 1974 – The men's team qualifies to Elitserien after one season in Division One and recruits an American player, Roscoe Wilson, who turns into an idol for the young players in Södertälje. Blombackahallen, which had a capacity of 600 people, was too small and in December 1974 a basketball team plays the first game ever in a hockey arena. 5700 people watche SBBK vs. Alvik in Scaniarinken.
- 1976 – The women's team advances to Elitserien. The team recruits a couple of players who played in the national team. One of them was Ann-Marie Wikner, a big center from Högsbo.
- 1977 – The women's team wins It first championship, the first of nine in a row. 1977–1985. The men's team loses in the final against Alvik but a new record is set for people watching (6414).
- 1978 – The men's team wins its first Swedish championship. They defeat Alvik with 3-2 in a best-of-five series. The American players that season were Lawrence McCray and Glenn Berry. The team surprises in its international debut, advancing to the quarterfinals. They meet Sinudyne Virtus, Steana Bukarest and FC Barcelona.
- 1979 – The men's team competes in the European Cup but doesn't advance from pool play. The club gets economic problems after two years of international basketball. It takes the club three years to fix the problems.
- 1984 – On 18 January Täljehallen is opened. An arena built for basketball with three courts and stands, Täljehallen has a capacity of 2000 people.
- 1987 – The Swedish Idrottsförbund chose SBBK as club of the year. The club has 1800 active players and 150 teams in different series.
- 1987 – After a dramatic final against Alvik, SBBK's men team wins the championship for the second time. The American player Marc Glass makes a three-pointer at the ending of the game.
- 1988 - The men's team wins the Swedish championship for the third time. SBBK's small guard Bo Alvin Duke turns into a crowd favourite due to his skills with the basketball. SBBK beats Aris Thessaloniki with 8 points in the European Cup but has no chance in the second meeting, away from home.
- 1992 – Basketligan (the men's basketball league) is started. The first round of the season (7 games) is played in the Globe Arena in front of 7000 people.
- 1995 – SBBK's men's team switches name to Södertälje Kings.
- 1997 – The women's team wins, after twelve years, its tenth championship.
- 1998 – SBBK has its 30 years birthday and celebrates with both a women's and a men's game against 08 Stockholm in Scaniarinken. Artist performances are also a part of the celebration.
- 1999 – The women's team gets its own sponsor and is called Telge Energi.
- 2005 – The men's team wins the Swedish championship
- 2008 – SBBK has its 40-year birthday
- 2008 – The Södertälje Kings win their 11th Swedish national championship

== Trophies ==
- Basketligan

Champions (12): 1977–78, 1986–87, 1987–88, 1989–90, 1990–91, 1991–92, 2004–05, 2012–13, 2013–14, 2014–15, 2015–16, 2018–19

== Season by season ==
Season	Tier	League	Pos.	European competitions	
2010–11	1	Basketligan	4th		
2011–12	1	Basketligan	2nd		
2012–13	1	Basketligan	1st	3 EuroChallenge	RS
2013–14	1	Basketligan	1st	3 EuroChallenge	RS
2014–15	1	Basketligan	1st	3 EuroChallenge	RS
2015–16	1	Basketligan	1st	3 FIBA Europe Cup	R32
2016–17	1	Basketligan	2nd	4 FIBA Europe Cup	SR
2017–18	1	Basketligan	3rd	4 FIBA Europe Cup	QR2
2018–19	1	Basketligan	1st	4 FIBA Europe Cup	QR1
2019–20	1	Basketligan	4th	3 Champions League	QR1
2019–20	1	Basketligan	4th	4 FIBA Europe Cup	RS
2020–21	1	Basketligan	2nd		
2021–22	1	Basketligan	3rd		
2022–23	1	Basketligan	8th		
2023–24	1	Basketligan	6th		
2024–25	1	Basketligan	8th		

== Players ==
=== Current roster ===
Södertälje BBK roster
Players
Coaches

Pos.	No.	Nat.	Name	Ht.	Wt.
G/F	6	(Sweden)	Holm, Oskar	1.97 m (6 ft 6 in)
F	9	(Croatia)	Bizaca, Toni	2.03 m (6 ft 8 in)	100 kg (220 lb)
SG	10	(Sweden)	Pahlmblad, Martin	1.93 m (6 ft 4 in)	88 kg (194 lb)
SF	11	(Sweden)	Ramstedt, Adam	2.08 m (6 ft 10 in)
PG	12	(United States)	Wilson, Derrick	1.85 m (6 ft 1 in)	98 kg (216 lb)
PG	13	(United States)	Joseph, Mike (C)	1.85 m (6 ft 1 in)	81 kg (179 lb)
G	15	(Greece)	Agathangelidis, Dimitris	1.82 m (6 ft 0 in)
SF	21	(United States)	Anderson, Aaron	2.01 m (6 ft 7 in)	100 kg (220 lb)
PG	14	(United States)	Tuck, Christian	1.77 m (5 ft 10 in)	85 kg (187 lb)

Head coach

- (Croatia) Vedran Bosnic

Assistant coach(es)

- (Sweden) Ludvig Degernäs
- (Sweden) Srdjan Klinas

Legend

- (C) Team captain
- Injured

- Roster
Updated: 2016-6-16

Note: Flags indicate national team eligibility at FIBA-sanctioned events. Players may hold other non-FIBA nationalities not displayed.

=== Individual awards ===
Basketligan MVP

- Toni Bizaca (2): 2013, 2014
- John Roberson: 2015

Basketligan Finals MVP

- Johnell Smith: 2012
- John Roberson: 2013
- Toni Bizaca: 2014
- Skyler Bowlin: 2016

=== Notable players ===
Note: Flags indicate national team eligibility at FIBA-sanctioned events. Players may hold other non-FIBA nationalities not displayed.

Criteria

To appear in this section a player must have either:

- Set a club record or won an individual award while at the club
- Played at least one official international match for their national team at any time
- Played at least one official NBA match at any time.

- (Sweden) Alexander Lindqvist
- (Sweden) Dino Pita
- (United States) John Roberson
- (United States) Johnell Smith
- (United States) Skyler Bowlin
- (Sweden) Thomas Massamba
- (Croatia) Toni Bizaca

== Organizational structure ==
SBBK can be divided into three parts: elite- and young elites (All-star), Stadsdelsverksamheten (SDV) and Södertälje Basketball League (SBL). SBL is where everyone can play, from a young player to an adult. The home for SBBK is in Täljehallen in the center of Södertälje, next to the new hospital.

=== Elite ===
SBBK has a men's team, Södertälje Kings, in the highest league (Basketligan) and the women's team, Telge Basket, also play in the highest league (Damligan). On the men's side the development team is called Knights and play in Basketettan. The women's development team is called Kringlan Basket and play in the second division in Stockholm. Beneath these teams there are youth teams in SBBK's elite preparation which are called All-Star. Young prospects play in those teams and the first audition is in the sixth grade in school. Many of SBBK's championship golds such as Swedish Cup have been captured by these teams. SBBK is one of the most dominating teams on the youth- and elite league in Sweden.

On the side of the basketball teams there is a co-operation with Södertälje Municipality which allows students from the seventh grade up to the last year of high-school to practice during schooltime. Rosenborgsskolan and Igelstavikens Gymnasium are schools where students can combine their studies with basketball.

=== Stadsdelsverksamhet (SDV) ===
Every child from 6 to 15 years old is allowed to participate in SDV. They can go to a practise, get enrolled, and be able to participate in games. Most of the times the children chose to play with the team that is closest to the school. There are teams spread all over Södertälje. The teams have different names such as Rams (Soldalaskolan), Bulls (Blombackaskolan) and Wolves (Fornbackaskolan).

=== Södertälje Basketball League (SBL) ===
For players older than 15 there is another league called Södertälje Basketball League. The league is open for both seasoned players and rookies. The players create teams and manages the league pretty much by themselves.
