= Jämtland Basket =

Swedish basketball club

- Leagues: Basketligan
- Founded: 1956
- History: Jämtland Ambassadors (?–1998); Jämtland Basket (1998–present)
- Arena: Östersunds Sporthall
- Capacity: 1,700
- Location: Östersund, Sweden
- Team colors: Blue, White
- Head coach: Adnan Chuk (men's team)
- Championships: 0
- Website: jamtlandbasket.se (in Swedish)
Home	Away

KFUM Jämtland Basket is a professional basketball club based in Östersund, Sweden. Founded in 1956, the team plays in the Swedish Basketball League (SBL), the top Swedish basketball league. Home games are played in the Östersunds Sporthall, which has a capacity for 1,700 people.

The club also has a women's team playing at the highest national level.

== History ==
The team was previously named the Jämtland Ambassadors before the organisation went bankrupt in 1998. The team was re-founded under its current name Jämtland Basket. They played a couple of seasons in the second-tier Basketettan before promoting back in 2000.

In the 2021–22 season, Jämtland had its best performance in club history as they reached the finals of the Swedish Basketball League for the first time after beating Köping Basket in the quarter-finals and Södertälje BBK in the semi-finals. In the finals, They lost to Norrköping Dolphins, 2–4.

In May 2022, Jämtland announced it would be making its European debut in the FIBA Europe Cup, having qualified as Swedish runner-up. They were placed in the qualifying rounds.

== Identity ==
The club colours are blue and white and the logo features a basketball and a moose, an animal common in Sweden. The mascot of the team is Bruce the Moose.

== Players ==
=== Notable players ===
- (Australia) / (Belgium) Marshall Nelson
- (Estonia) Jaan Puidet
- (Croatia) Nikolas Tomsick
- (Guyana) / (United States) Cyril Langevine
- (United States) / (Sweden) R. T. Guinn
- (United States) Craig Hodges
- (United States) Marcus Liberty
- (United States) Andrew Smith
- (United States) Missy Traversi

== Coaches ==
=== Men's team ===
- (Sweden) Adnan Chuk (2020–present)
- (Spain) Gabriel Loaiza Pérez (2025–present)
