= Fryshuset Basket =

- Leagues: Basketligan
- Founded: 1984
- Arena: Fryshuset Sporthall
- Location: Stockholm, Sweden
- Team colors: Red, White
- Head coach: Ake Barlin (men's team)
- Website: fryshusetbasket.se (in Swedish)
Home	Away

Fryshuset Basket is a basketball club founded in 1984 in Stockholm, Sweden. The clubs plays in the Basketligan Swedish top basketball league. Home games are played in the Fryshuset Sporthall.

== Notable players ==
Note: Flags indicate national team eligibility at FIBA-sanctioned events. Players may hold other non-FIBA nationalities not displayed.

Criteria

To appear in this section a player must have either:

- Set a club record or won an individual award while at the club
- Played at least one official international match for their national team at any time
- Played at least one official NBA match at any time.

- (Sweden) Barra Njie
