= KFUM Nässjö =

- Founded: 1939
- Location: Nässjö, Sweden
- Website: nassjobasket.se

KFUM Nässjö is an YMCA association in Nässjö, Sweden. The club has played in the men's Swedish top division, and was established in 1939.

== Notable players ==
Note: Flags indicate national team eligibility at FIBA-sanctioned events. Players may hold other non-FIBA nationalities not displayed.

Criteria

To appear in this section a player must have either:

- Set a club record or won an individual award while at the club
- Played at least one official international match for their national team at any time
- Played at least one official NBA match at any time.

- (Sweden) Alexander Lindqvist
- (Denmark) Zarko Jukic
- (Kosovo) Edis Kuraja
