= Köping Basket =

Köping Stars
- Leagues: Basketligan
- Founded: 2003; 22 years ago
- Arena: Köpings Bad och Sport
- Capacity: ≈1800
- Location: Köping, Sweden
- Team colors: Blue and white
- President: Kjell Johansson
- Vice-president(s): Tomas Bandh
- Team manager: Stefan Ståhlman
- Head coach: Torbjörn Gehrke
- Assistant(s): Andris Kehris & Roger Kelly
- Team captain: Niklas Larsson
- 2019–20 position: Basketligan, 3rd* of 10
Away

Köping Basket, also known as The Köping Stars, is a basketball club based in Köping, Sweden. The club was founded in 2003, but changed its name for the men's team to Köping Stars in January 2018. The club plays its home games in the Köpings Bad och Sport arena. Since the 2018–19 season, Stars plays in the Basketligan, the highest tier of basketball in Sweden.

== Players ==
=== Current roster ===
Note: Flags indicate national team eligibility at FIBA-sanctioned events. Players may hold other non-FIBA nationalities not displayed.

Köping Stars roster
Players
Coaches

Pos.	No.	Nat.	Name
PG	1	(United States)	Jackson, C. J.
PF	3	(United States)	Victor II, Craig
G	4	(Sweden)	Klaasma, Simon
G/F	6	(Sweden)	Zekovic, Alan
PG	7	(Sweden)	Hansson, Gustav
SF	8	(Sweden)	kur Muorwell, Muorwell
F	9	(Latvia)	Kalve, Ernests
PF/C	10	(Sweden)	Petersen, Michiel
SF	13	(Sweden)	Larsson, Niklas
C	21	(Sweden)	Larsson, Alexander
F		(Nigeria)	Arikawe, Tope

Head coach

(Sweden) Torbjörn Gehrke

Assistant coach(es)

(Sweden) Andris Kehris
(Latvia) Andris Kehris
(Canada) Roger Kelly

Legend

- (C) Team captain
- Injured

- Roster
Updated: 16 December 2020

=== Notable former players ===
- Austin Price (born 1995), American

== Honors ==
Total titles: 2

- Superettan
  - Champions (1): 2017–18
- Basketligan
  - Third place (1): 2019–20*
