= BC Luleå =

- Leagues: Basketligan
- Founded: 1976; 50 years ago
- History: List: Plannja Basket (1976–2007) LF Basket Norrbotten (2007–2015) BC Luleå (2015–present)
- Arena: Luleå Energi Arena
- Capacity: 2,500
- Location: Luleå, Sweden
- Head coach: Håkan Larsson
- 2025–26 position: Basketligan, 3rd
- Championships: 8 Swedish Championships
- Website: bclulea.se
Home	Away

BasketballClub Luleå is a Swedish professional basketball club from Luleå, that competes in the Swedish Basketball League (SBL), the top tier of Sweden. The team has won the national championship eight times.

== History ==
The club was founded in 1976 as Plannja Basket. From 1996 till 2007 Plannja won 7 Swedish titles, the only season they didn't win it was the 2002–03 season. Until the 2012–2013 season LF Basket played its home games in the Pontushallen, which held a capacity of 3,000. The club then moved to the ARCUS Arena during the 2012–2013 season due to reconstructions. Starting with the 2013–2014 season it has moved back, although the new name of the Pontushallen arena is Luleå Energi Arena.

In 2015, LF Basket changed its name to BC Luleå. In 2017, the club won its eight national championship.

== Trophies ==
- Basketligan (8):

1996–97, 1998–99, 1999–00, 2001–02, 2003–04, 2005–06, 2006–07, 2016–17
Runner-up: 2009–10, 2017–18

== Players ==
=== Current roster ===
Note: Flags indicate national team eligibility at FIBA-sanctioned events. Players may hold other non-FIBA nationalities not displayed.

BC Luleå roster
Players
Coaches

Pos.	No.	Nat.	Name	Ht.	Age
F	0	(United States)	Holmes, RJ	2.01 m (6 ft 7 in)	24 – 23 February 2002
SF	2	(Sweden)	Nilsson, Kembo	1.95 m (6 ft 5 in)	21 – 3 August 2005
G	3	(United States)	Leach, Jalen	1.93 m (6 ft 4 in)	25 – 12 January 2001
G	6	(Sweden)	Hansson, Daniel	1.88 m (6 ft 2 in)	29 – 24 January 1997
G	7	(Sweden)	Enbom, Elliot	1.83 m (6 ft 0 in)	20 – 22 April 2006
G	11	(Iceland)	Steinsen, Leo	1.84 m (6 ft 0 in)	18 – 6 June 2008
F	12	(Sweden)	Ninkingira, Jonathan	1.98 m (6 ft 6 in)	26 – 22 November 1999
F	13	(Sweden)	Hassler, Harry	2.01 m (6 ft 7 in)	20 – 14 July 2006
F	13	(Australia)	Naivalurua, Tuburu	2.03 m (6 ft 8 in)	24 – 4 June 2002
C	15	(Sweden)	Sjoberg, Tobias	2.05 m (6 ft 9 in)	29 – 5 February 1997
PG	20	(Sweden)	Arvidsson, Jonatan	1.84 m (6 ft 0 in)	28 – 31 March 1998
SG	25	(Sweden)	Gonzalez, John	1.98 m (6 ft 6 in)	17 – 28 March 2009
F	44	(United States)	Galette, Nico	1.98 m (6 ft 6 in)	24 – 22 June 2002

Head coach

- (Sweden) Håkan Larsson

Assistant coach(es)

- (Sweden) Peter Örqvist

Legend

- (C) Team captain
- Injured

- Roster
Updated: 2026-09-30

== Notable players ==
- (Finland) Vesa Mäkäläinen
- (The Bahamas) Kentwan Smith
- (United States) Andrew Smith
- (United States) Kent Washington

== Season by season ==
Season	Tier	League	Pos.	European competitions	
2010–11	1	Basketligan	3rd		
2011–12	1	Basketligan	6th		
2012–13	1	Basketligan	7th		
2013–14	1	Basketligan	7th		
2014–15	1	Basketligan	6th		
2015–16	1	Basketligan	3rd		
2016–17	1	Basketligan	1st		
2017–18	1	Basketligan	2nd	3 Champions League	QR1
2018–19	1	Basketligan	5th	4 FIBA Europe Cup	QR2
2019–20	1	Basketligan	2nd		
2020–21	1	Basketligan	5th		
2021–22	1	Basketligan	4th		
2022–23	1	Basketligan	5th		
2023–24	1	Basketligan	4th		
2024–25	1	Basketligan	3rd		
