= Ockelbo =

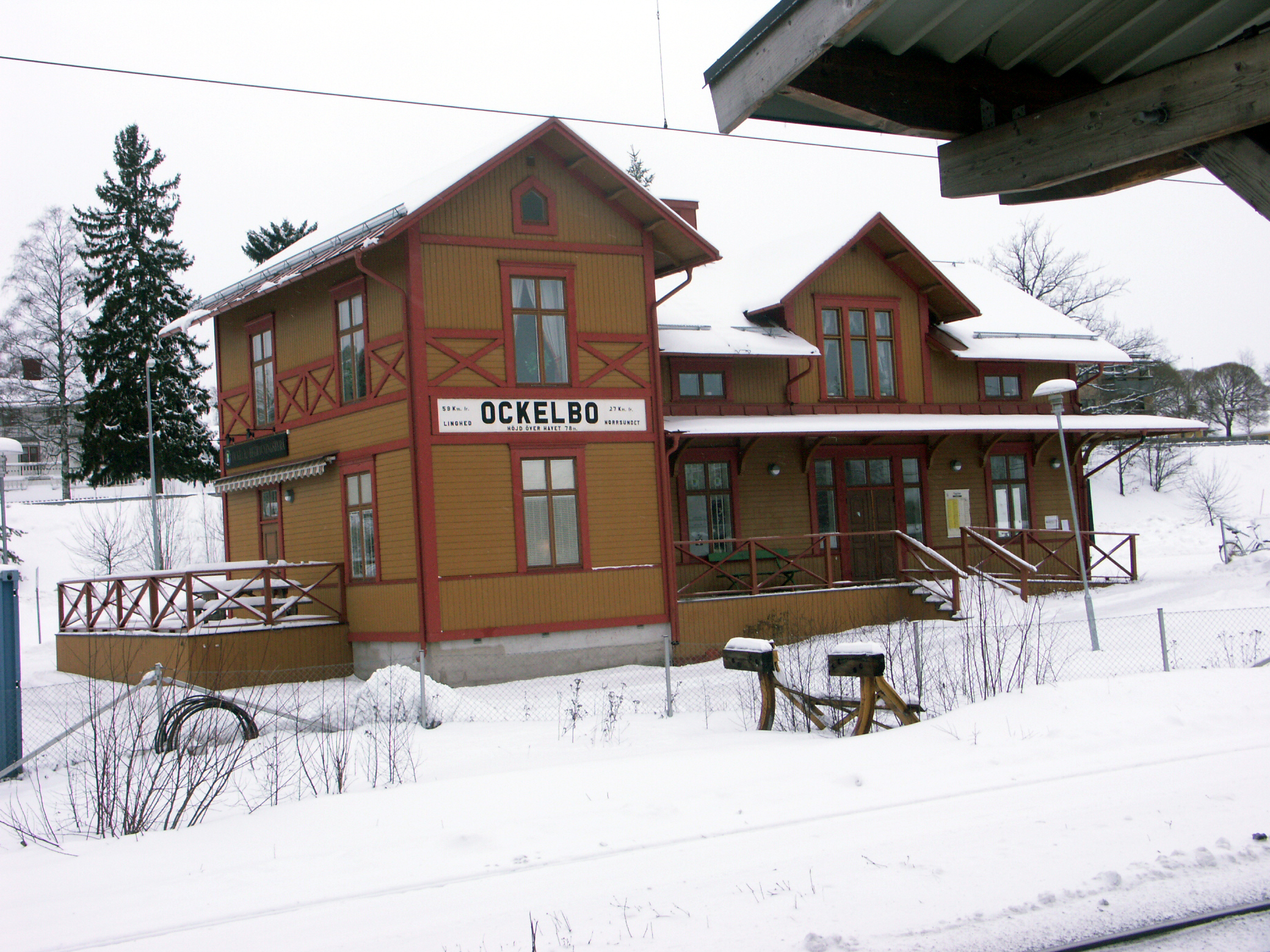
- Ockelbo Train Station in February 2006

- Location within Sweden Gävleborg Location within Sweden
- Coordinates: 60°53′N 16°43′E
- Country: Sweden
- Province: Gästrikland
- County: Gävleborg County
- Municipality: Ockelbo Municipality

Area
  - Total: 4.17 km^{2} (1.61 sq mi)

Population (31 December 2010)
  - Total: 2,724
  - Density: 654/km^{2} (1,690/sq mi)
- Time zone: UTC+1 (CET)
  - Summer (DST): UTC+2 (CEST)

Ockelbo is a locality and the seat of Ockelbo Municipality, Gävleborg County, Sweden with 2,724 inhabitants in 2010.

Ockelbo is primarily known for its basketball team, the annual summer and winter market, and the rose gardens at Wij Trädgårdar. The Ockelbo Expo records the town's history in specialist vehicle manufacturing, including snowmobiles and racing cars.

== Early history ==
The name Ockelbo, spelled De oklabo in 1314, contains an old marine name *Ukle, referring to modern-day Lake Bysjön. The name derives from the old Swedish word ukla, meaning 'swell, gain etc.', alluding to the rapid changes in the water level of the lake. The second part of the name, -bo, means district or region. Approximately 150 ancient monuments are registered, including several Stone Age settlements. The majority are, however, grave mounds from the late Iron Age and are located in seven grave-fields. One such example is the grave-field at Wij, which consists of 43 graves. Abundant discoveries of low technology iron slag bear witness to the long tradition of iron production in the area.

== Notable buildings ==
In the 13th century a Romanesque church was built in Ockelbo. A new church was built between 1791 and 1793 in accordance with sketches made by the county governor, F. A. U. Cronstedt. This church was completely destroyed in a fire in 1904. Between 1906 and 1908 a new church was built in line with sketches made by the architect Gustaf Améen. The church is characterised by its neo-baroque style. The interior was thoroughly remodeled during a renovation undertaken during 1956 and 1957. On the choir wall is an altar mosaic by Gun Setterdahl. The mosaic's strong colours give the whole room its character. In the western section of the church a chapel was built and was named after the patron saint of the church, Saint Martin of Tours.

When the medieval church was demolished in 1795 a runestone later designated as runic inscription Gs 19 was found bricked up in the foundations. When the church burnt down in 1904 the stone was destroyed. A copy was made in 1932 based on reproductions made in the 1880s. The runestone shows motifs from the Sigurd Fafnesbane-tale and was one of the most image-rich rune stones on the Swedish mainland.

The Wij Iron Forge and country estate were built in the 17th century and were owned for a while by Sven Bröms and subsequently by his daughter Catharina Bröms. It was a part of the Ockeboverke as were also the iron forges at Åbron, Brattfors, and Jädraås. In 1793 the estate was owned by Mårten Bunge, the Master of the Chase. The works are very well preserved.

== Notable residents ==
Ockelbo is where Prince Daniel of Sweden, the husband of Crown Princess Victoria, grew up. Another Ockelbo native is Svante Stockselius, the executive supervisor of the Eurovision Song Contest. Ockelbo is also known for racing driver, Erik Lundgren.
