= Alviks BK =

- Founded: 1956
- Dissolved: 1996 (First team)
- History: 1956–1996
- Location: Alvik, Sweden
- Championships: 19 Swedish Leagues
- Website: Alvik Basket

Alviks Basketklubb or simply Alvik was a Swedish basketball club based in Alvik, a residential district in western Stockholm Municipality.

== History ==
The club was formed on August 31, 1956 by Erik Bremer and became one of the major basketball powers of the national league until it transformated to professional under the name Basketligan in 1992. In 1994–95 season, Alvik won the last title in its history. In the early 1996–97 season, the club joined forces with KFUM Söder and Stockholm Capitals and they formed a new basketball club the 08 Stockholm Human Rights.

== Honours ==
- Swedish League

Winners (19): 1962–63, 1963–64, 1964–65, 1965–66, 1966–67, 1967–68, 1969–70, 1970–71, 1971–72, 1973–74, 1974–75, 1975–76, 1976–77, 1978–79, 1980–81, 1981–82, 1982–83, 1985–86, 1994–95
