= Täljehallen =

Indoor arena in Södertälje, Sweden

Coordinates: 59.1988°N 17.6367°E

- Interactive map of Täljehallen
- Capacity: 2,000

Construction
- Opened: 18 January 1984

Täljehallen, is an indoor arena for basketball matches, in Södertälje, Sweden. It has a capacity of 2,000 spectators.

== Notable sports events held in the arena ==
- 2009 FIBA Europe Under-18 Women's Championship
