= Swedish Basketball League =

Swedish men's basketball top division

Svenska Basketligan
- Organising body: Swedish Basketball Federation
- Founded: 1992; 34 years ago
- First season: 1992–93
- Country: Sweden
- Confederation: FIBA Europe
- Number of teams: 11
- Level on pyramid: 1
- Relegation to: Superettan
- International cup(s): Champions League; Europe Cup
- Current champions: Borås (2nd title) (2025–26)
- Most championships: Södertälje BBK (12 titles)
- President: Sören Westin
- Website: sblherr.se

Svenska Basketligan, or the Swedish Basketball League (SBL), is the premier league for professional basketball in Sweden. The league was originally established in 1992 as Basketligan and was known as that prior to the season of 2006–07, but when the Swedish company Obol Investment signed an agreement with the Swedish Basketball Federation in early October 2006, the league was renamed Obol Basketball League (OBL). In January 2007 the name was changed to Ligan, meaning simply the League.

== History ==
On October 6, 2006, the Swedish Basketball Federation signed a 15-year agreement with Swiss company Obol Investment. Part of the deal was that Basketligan would be renamed Obol Basketball League. Other parts of the deal include that the winning team would receive prize money if the team were to play in the EuroLeague during the following season. The agreement lasted for 15 years, but after five years Obol would make an evaluation and have the rights to then cancel the deal, if they so wish.

Location of teams in the 2024–25 Basketligan

== Current teams ==
Team	City	Venue	Capacity
Borås	Borås	Boråshallen	3,000
Högsbo Basket	Gothenburg	Gothia Arena	1,000
Jämtland	Östersund	Östersunds Sporthall	1,700
Köping Stars	Köping	Köping Bad & Sport	1,400
Luleå	Luleå	Luleå Energi Arena	2,700
Norrköping Dolphins	Norrköping	Stadium Arena	3,500
Nässjö	Nässjö	Nässjö Sporthall	1,200
Södertälje BBK	Södertälje	Täljehallen	2,100
Umeå	Umeå	Umeå Energi Arena	2,000
Uppsala Basket	Uppsala	Fyrishov	3,000

== Finals ==
Season	Champion	Runner-up	Score	Finals MVP
1992–93	Stockholm Capitals	Norrköping Dolphins	3–0	—N/a
1993–94	Kärcher Basket	Norrköping Dolphins	3–0	—N/a
1994–95	Alvik	Kärcher Basket	3–0	—N/a
1995–96	New Wave Sharks	Södertälje Kings	3–2	—N/a
1996–97	Plannja Basket	M7 Borås	3–1	—N/a
1997–98	Norrköping Dolphins	Plannja Basket	3–1	—N/a
1998–99	Plannja Basket	08 Stockholm Human Rights	3–0	—N/a
1999–00	Plannja Basket	M7 Borås	3–1	—N/a
2000–01	08 Stockholm Human Rights	Norrköping Dolphins	3–0	—N/a
2001–02	Plannja Basket	Södertälje Kings	3–2	—N/a
2002–03	Solna Vikings	Plannja Basket	3–1	—N/a
2003–04	Plannja Basket	Norrköping Dolphins	4–1	—N/a
2004–05	Södertälje Kings	Sundsvall Dragons	4–2	—N/a
2005–06	Plannja Basket	Solna Vikings	4–1	—N/a
2006–07	Plannja Basket	08 Stockholm Human Rights	4–2	—N/a
2007–08	Solna Vikings	Sundsvall Dragons	3–0	—N/a
2008–09	Sundsvall Dragons	Solna Vikings	4–3	—N/a
2009–10	Norrköping Dolphins	Plannja Basket	4–1	—N/a
2010–11	Sundsvall Dragons	Norrköping Dolphins	4–3	—N/a
2011–12	Norrköping Dolphins	Södertälje Kings	4–2	(United States) Johnell Smith
2012–13	Södertälje Kings	Sundsvall Dragons	4–2	(United States) John Roberson
2013–14	Södertälje Kings	Norrköping Dolphins	4–3	(Croatia) Toni Bizaca
2014–15	Södertälje Kings	Uppsala	4–1	(United States) John Roberson
2015–16	Södertälje Kings	Norrköping Dolphins	4–0	(United States) Skyler Bowlin
2016–17	BC Luleå	Södertälje Kings	4–1	(United States) Brandon Rozzell
2017–18	Norrköping Dolphins	BC Luleå	4–3	—N/a
2018–19	Södertälje Kings	Borås Basket	4–1	—N/a
2019–20 (Note: The 2019–20 season was terminated early due to the COVID-19 pandemic. As such, Borås was named league champions based on standings at the time.)	Borås	BC Luleå	—N/a	—N/a
2020–21	Norrköping Dolphins	Södertälje BBK	4–0	(Sweden) Adam Ramstedt
2021–22	Norrköping Dolphins	Jämtland Basket	4–2	(Sweden) Felix Terins
2022–23	Norrköping Dolphins	Borås Basket	4–2	(United States) Devonte Green
2023–24	Norrköping Dolphins	Borås Basket	4–1	(Sweden) Felix Terins
2024–25	Norrköping Dolphins	Borås Basket	4–1	(United States) Shane Hunter
2025–26	Borås Basket	Norrköping Dolphins	4–2	(United States) KJ Jenkins

=== Performance by club ===
Teams in italic are no longer active.

Club	Winners	Runners-up	Years won
Norrköping Dolphins	9	7	1998, 2010, 2012, 2018, 2021, 2022, 2023, 2024, 2025
Luleå (Note: Won several championships as "Plannja Basket".)	8	4	1997, 1999, 2000, 2002, 2004, 2006, 2007, 2017
Södertälje Kings	6	4	2005, 2013, 2014, 2015, 2016, 2019
Borås	2	5	2020, 2026
Sundsvall Dragons	2	3	2009, 2011
Solna Vikings	2	2	2003, 2008
08 Stockholm Human Rights	1	2	2001
Kärcher	1	1	1994
Stockholm Capitals	1	–	1993
Alvik	1	–	1995
New Wave Sharks	1	–	1996
Uppsala	–	1	–

== Awards ==
- Most Valuable Player
- Finals MVP
- Rookie of the Year
- Best Defender
- Guard of the Year
- Forward of the Year
- Center of the Year

== See also ==
- List of sporting events in Sweden
- Basketligan All-Star Game
