= Basketligan awards =

Swedish basketball awards

Individual awards handed out by the Basketligan, the top level basketball league of Sweden.

== MVP ==
Season	Nat.	Player	Team	Notes
2000–01	(Sweden)	Fred Drains	Norrköping Dolphins	
2001–02	(Sweden)	Fred Drains	Norrköping Dolphins	
2002–03	(United States)	Eric Talyor	Solna Vikings	
2003–04	(United States)	Gee Gervin	Norrköping Dolphins	
2004–05	(Sweden)	Fred Drains (2)	Plannja Basket	
2005–06	(United States)	Derrick Tarver	Solna Vikings	
2006–07	(Sweden)	Fred Drains (3)	Plannja Basket	
2007–08	(Sweden)	Joakim Kjellbom	Sundsvall Dragons	
2008–09	(Sweden)	Lesli Myrthil	Solna Vikings	
2009–10	(Sweden)	Joakim Kjellbom (2)	Norrköping Dolphins	
2010–11	(United States)	Alex Wesby	Sundsvall Dragons	
2011–12	(United States)	Johnell Smith	Södertälje Kings	
2012–13	(Croatia)	Toni Bizaca	Södertälje Kings	
2013–14	(Croatia)	Toni Bizaca (2)	Södertälje Kings	

== Finals MVP ==
Season	Nat.	Player	Team	Notes
2011–12	(United States)	Johnell Smith	Södertälje Kings	
2012–13	(United States)	John Roberson	Södertälje Kings	
2013–14	(Croatia)	Toni Bizaca	Södertälje Kings	

== Defensive Player of the Year ==
Season	Nat.	Player	Team	Notes
2011–12	(Sweden)	Rickard Eriksson	Uppsala	
2012–13	(Iceland)	Hlynur Bæringsson	Sundsvall Dragons	
2013–14	(Iceland)	Hlynur Bæringsson (2)	Sundsvall Dragons	
2014–15	(United States)	Alex Wesby	LF Basket	
2015–16	(Sweden)	Joakim Kjellbom	Norrköping Dolphins	
2016–17	(Sweden)	Joakim Kjellbom (2)	Norrköping Dolphins	
2017–18	(United States)	Quinton Upshur	BC Luleå	
2018–19	(United States)	Auston Barnes	Södertälje Kings	
2019–20	(Sweden)	Denzel Andersson	BC Luleå	
2020–21	(Sweden)	Adam Ramstedt	Norrköping Dolphins	
2021–22	(Sweden)	Tim Schüberg	Norrköping Dolphins	
2022–23	(Sweden)	Pierre Hampton	Jämtland Basket	
2023–24	(Sweden)	Adam Ramstedt (2)	Norrköping Dolphins	
2024–25	(Sweden)	Nick Spires	Södertälje BBK	
2025–26	(United States)	CJ Dunston	Umeå BSKT	

== Rookie of the Year ==
Season	Nat.	Player	Team	Notes
2011–12	(Sweden)	Niklas Larsson	Solna Vikings	
2012–13	(Sweden)	Mathias Liljeqvist	KFUM Nassjo	
2013–14	(Sweden)	Mikael Axelsson	Eco Örebro	

== Guard, Forward and Center of the Year ==
Season	Guard of the Year			Forward of the Year			Center of the Year			Notes
Season	Nat.	Player	Team	Nat.	Player	Team	Nat.	Player	Team	Notes
2000–01	(Sweden)	Olle Håkansson	08 Alvik Stockholm	(United States)	Landry Kosmalski	08 Alvik Stockholm	(United States)	Inus Norville	Sundsvall Dragons	Notes
2001–02	(United States)	Eddie Shannon	Plannja	(United States)	Kevin Brooks	Södertälje Kings	(United States)	Josh Shoemaker	Plannja	Notes
2002–03	(United States)	Eric Taylor	Solna Vikings	(United States) (Israel)	Chris Watson	Jämtland	(Sweden)	Mattias Sahlström	Solna Vikings	Notes
2003–04	(United States)	Gee Gervin	Norrköping Dolphins	(United States)	Brent Wright	Plannja	(Sweden)	John Rosendahl	Plannja	Notes
2004–05	(United States)	James Miller	Sundsvall Dragons	(United States)	Fred Drains	Plannja	(United States)	Mike Palm	Sundsvall Dragons	Notes
2005–06	(United States)	Derrick Tarver	Solna Vikings	(Sweden)	Joakim Kjellbom	Sundsvall Dragons	(United States)	Mike Palm (2)	Sundsvall Dragons	Notes
2006–07	(United States)	Jerel Blassingame	Solna Vikings	(Sweden)	Lesli Myrthil	Solna Vikings	(Sweden)	John Rosendahl (2)	Plannja	Notes
2007–08	(Sweden)	Rudy Mbemba	Solna Vikings	(United States)	Alex Wesby	Sundsvall Dragons	(Sweden)	John Rosendahl (3)	Plannja	Notes
2008–09	(United States)	Thomas Jackson	Uppsala	(Sweden)	Lesli Myrthil (2)	Solna Vikings	(Sweden)	Johan Åkesson	08 Stockholm	Notes
2009–10	(Sweden)	Håkan Larsson	Plannja	(United States)	Gordon Watt	Uppsala	(United States)	Mike Palm (3)	Borås	Notes
2010–11	(United States)	Johnell Smith	Södertälje Kings	(Australia)	Liam Rush	Sundsvall Dragons	(Sweden)	Joakim Kjellbom	Norrköping Dolphins	Notes
2011–12	(United States)	Omar Krayem	Borås	(United States)	Keith Ramsey	LF Norrbotten	(United States)	Mike Palm (4)	Borås	Notes
2012–13	(United States)	James Miller (2)	Borås	(United States)	Kodi Augustus	08 Stockholm	(United States)	Keith Wright	Uppsala	Notes
2013–14	(United States)	James Miller (3)	Borås	(Croatia)	Toni Bizaca	Södertälje Kings	(Sweden)	Joakim Kjellbom (2)	Norrköping Dolphins	Notes
2014–15	(United States) (Bosnia and Herzegovina)	John Roberson	Södertälje Kings	(Sweden)	Christian Maråker	Borås	(Sweden)	Joakim Kjellbom (3)	Norrköping Dolphins	Notes
2015–16	(Sweden)	Charles Barton	Sundsvall Dragons	(Croatia)	Toni Bizaca (2)	Södertälje Kings	(Sweden)	Joakim Kjellbom (4)	Norrköping Dolphins	Notes
2016–17	(United States)	Brandon Rozzell	Luleå	(United States)	Cole Darling	Norrköping Dolphins	(Sweden)	Joakim Kjellbom (5)	Norrköping Dolphins	Notes
2017–18	(United States)	Arik Smith	Umeå	(Sweden)	Axel Nordström	Uppsala	(Sweden)	Joakim Kjellbom (6)	Norrköping Dolphins	Notes
2018–19	(United States)	Nimrod Hilliard	Borås	(United States)	Auston Barnes	Jämtland	(Sweden)	Joakim Kjellbom (7)	Norrköping Dolphins	Notes
2019–20	(Iceland)	Elvar Már Friðriksson	Borås	(Sweden)	Denzel Andersson	Luleå	(United States)	Jeremy Combs	Köping Stars	Notes
2020–21	(Canada)	Marek Klassen	Borås	(Sweden)	Viktor Gaddefors	Södertälje BBK	(Guyana) (United States)	Cyril Langevine	Jämtland	Notes
2021–22	(United States)	CJ Wilson	Jämtland	(Canada)	Jackson Rowe	Norrköping Dolphins	(United States)	Dartaye Ruffin	Nässjö	Notes
2022–23	(Sweden)	Gustav Hansson	Umeå BSKT	(Sweden)	Pierre Hampton	Jämtland	(Sweden)	Adam Ramstedt	Norrköping Dolphins	Notes
2023–24	(Sweden)	Charles Barton (2)	Södertälje BBK	(Spain)	Walter Cabral	Södertälje BBK	(Sweden)	Adam Ramstedt (2)	Norrköping Dolphins	Notes
2024–25	(United States)	Marcus Tyus	Norrköping Dolphins	(United States)	Brandon Johns	Luleå	(United States)	Dwight Wilson III	Köping Stars	Notes
2025–26	(United States)	Gustav Hansson (2)	Luleå	(Sweden)	Pierre Hampton (2)	Norrköping Dolphins	(England) (Sweden)	Nick Spires	Södertälje BBK	Notes
