= Basketligan All-Star Game =

Annual basketball event

Cyprus Basketball All-Star Day
- Status: Inctive
- Inaugurated: 2004-05
- Most recent: 2010-11
- Organizer: SBL

The Basketligan Basketball All-Star Game was an annual basketball event in Sweden, organised by the SBL. The All-Star Game or Weekend includes a match between a selection of the league's all-stars, a slam-dunk and a three-point contest. The league was originally established in 1992. The event did not continue after 2008, but it was re-established in 2011 for just one edition, adding in the skills contest. The 2011 was the most recent edition.

== List of games ==
Bold: Team that won the game.

Season	Team	Score	Team	MVP	Team
2004-05	**North**	**96**-94	South	(United States) James Miller	Sundsvall Dragons
2005-06	Team Europe	112-**114**	**Team USA**	(United States) Charles Thomas	Solna Vikings
2006-07	**Team Sweden**	(defeated)	Team World		
2007-08	Team Sweden	101-**105**	**Team World**	(United States) Alex Wesby	Sundsvall Dragons
2010-11	North	117-**128**	**South**	(United States) William Walker	Solna Vikings

== Three-Point Shoot Contest ==
Year	Winner	Team	Runner-up	Team
2004-05	(Sweden) Bo Eriksson	Sallen Basket	(United States) Eric Taylor	BC Luleå
2005-06	(United States) Orlando Lightfoot	Jämtland Basket	(Sweden) David Bergstrom	Norrköping Dolphins
2006-07	(Sweden) David Bergstrom	Norrköping Dolphins	(United States) Tim Whitworth	Sundsvall Dragons
2007-08	(United States) Tim Whitworth	Jämtland Basket	(Sweden) Johan Jeansson	Sallen Basket
2010-11	(United States) Tim Whitworth (2)	Sallen Basket	(Iceland) Jakob Sigurdarson	Sundsvall Dragons

== Slam-Dunk Contest ==
Year	Winner	Team	Runner-up	Team
2004-05	(United States) Rob Lewin	Plannja Basket	(Sweden) Jim Nystrom	Solna Vikings
2005-06	(United States) James Williams	Sallen Basket	(United States) Emmanuel 'Manny' Dies	08 Stockholm Human Rights
2006-07	(United States) Randall Orr	Gothia Basket	(United States) (Italy) Jeffrey Viggiano	Norrkoping Dolphins
2007-08	(United States) Bilal Salaam	Solna Vikings	(Sweden) Jim Nystrom, (United States) Nashid Beard	08 Stockholm Human Rights, 08 Stockholm Human Rights
2010-11	(United States) William Walker	Solna Vikings	(Sweden) Rudy Mbemba	LF Basket Norrbotten

== Skills Contest ==
Year	Winner	Team	Runner-up	Team
2010-11	(United States) Alex Wesby	Sundsvall Dragons	(Sweden) Willy Beck	08 Stockholm Human Rights

== Rosters ==
=== 2005 All-Star Game ===
North - South 96-94
NORTH (Christer Stjernborg from Sundsvall Dragons): Andrew Pleick, Håkan Larsson, Fred Drains, Joakim Kjellbom, Kenny Walker - James JJ Miller, Andrew Mitchell, Jim Nystrom, Cedric Taylor, Mike Palm.
SOUTH (Torbjorn Gehrke from Sodertalje Kings): Jens Stalhandske, Charles Thomas, Andrew Drevo, Nick Eppeheimer, Johan Akesson - Tezale Archie, Mikael Lindqvist, Steve Pettyjohn, Serdar Akyuz*, Jason Andreas*.
*Jason Andreas and Serdar Akyuz replaced injured Damen Maddox and starter David Bergstrom respectively.

=== 2006 All-Star Game ===
Team Europe - Team USA 112-114 (Quarters: 22–37, 28–29, 35–22, 27–26)
Europe: Andrew Pleick 23, Fred Drains 16, John P Rosendahl 14, Mikael Lindqvist 12, Michael Palm 11, Stefan Grundstrom 11, David Bergstrom 6, Lesli Myrthil 7, Jens Tillman 5, Håkan Larsson* 5.
USA: Derrick Tarver 41, Charles Thomas 25, Zach Williams 15, Quinnel Brown 12, Emmanuel Dies 6, Orlando Lightfoot 5, James Williams 4, Whitney Robinson 4, RT Guinn 2, Tommy Adams (did not play).
*Michael Bree did not play due to injury, replaced by Hakan Larsson.

=== 2007 All-Star Game ===
Team Sweden - Team World
Sweden (David Visscher & Matthias Kentta, Jens Stalhandske): Joakim Kjellbom, John Rosendahl, Fred Drains, Mike Palm, Jonathan Skjoldebrand, Mikael Lindqvist, Joakim Blom, Adnan Chuk, Håkan Larsson, Lesli Myrthil.
World (Peter Oqvist & Pontus Frivold, Dennis Cooper): Andrew Mitchell, Jerome Coleman (185-G-81, Boakai Lalugba, Lorenzo Gordon, Tim Whitworth, Howard Frier, Emmanuel Dies, Anthony Johnson, Thomas Jackson, Jeffrey Viggiano.

=== 2008 All-Star Game ===
Stockholm 2008: Team Sweden - Team World 101-105
Team Sweden (Jonte Karlsson from 08 Stockholm): Jonathan Skjoldebrandt 32, Joakim Blom 15, Joakim Kjellbom 14, Lesli Myrthil 8, Fredrik Jonzen 8, Jim Nystrom 7, John Rosendahl 6, Håkan Larsson 5, Fred Drains 4, Adam Alexander 2, Rudy Mbemba.
Team World (Pekka Salminen from Solna): Alex Wesby 22, Herman Favors 16, Tim Whitworth 15, Brandon McKnight 13, Jeremiah Johnson 12, Dee Ayuba 12, Bilal Salaam 7, Gerald Riley 4, Ian Johnson 2, Michael Kingma 2, Ryan McDade.

=== 2011 All-Star Weekend ===
20-21 February 2011, Sporthallen, (att: 2,174): North–South 117–128 (Quarters: 27–30, 23–34, 39–22, 28–42)
NORTH: Liam Rush 24, Drazen Klaric 19, Jakob Sigurdarson 14, Alex Wesby 13, Rudy Mbemba 13, Bilal Saalam 10, Hlynur Baeringsson 8, Tim Withworth 7, Benjamin Smith 5, Tim Kearny 4.
SOUTH: Johnell Smith 25, William Walker 25, Dino Pita 25, Logi Gunnarsson 15, Demetrius Brown 11, Kellen McCoy 9, Willy Beck 7, Christopher Ryan 7, Jesper Andersson 4.

== Topscorers ==
Season	Player	Points	Team
2006			
2006	(United States) Derrick Tarver	41	Solna Vikings
2007			
2008	(Sweden) Jonathan Skjöldebrand	32	Södertälje Kings
2011	(United States) Johnell Smith (United States) William Walker (Sweden) Dino Pita	25	Södertälje Kings; Solna Vikings; Södertälje Kings

== Players with most appearances (2004-2011) ==
Player	All-Star	Editions	Notes
(Sweden) Fred Drains	4	2005, 2006, 2007, 2008	
(Sweden) Håkan Larsson	4	2005, 2006, 2007, 2008	As a replacement in 2006
(Sweden) Joakim Kjellbom	3	2005, 2007, 2008	
(Sweden) John Rosendahl	3	2006, 2007, 2008	
