= Swedish Basketball League MVP =

Swedish basketball award

The Swedish Basketball League MVP award is an annual award that is handed out to the most valuable player in the Swedish Basketball League (SBL), which is the highest tier of professional basketball in the country of Sweden. The award was first introduced in the 1992–93 season. Formerly, it was named the Basketligan MVP.

== Winners ==
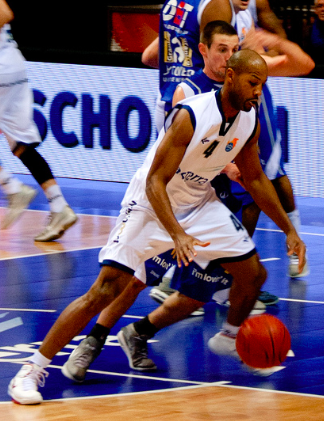
Alex Wesby was the winner in the 2010–11 season

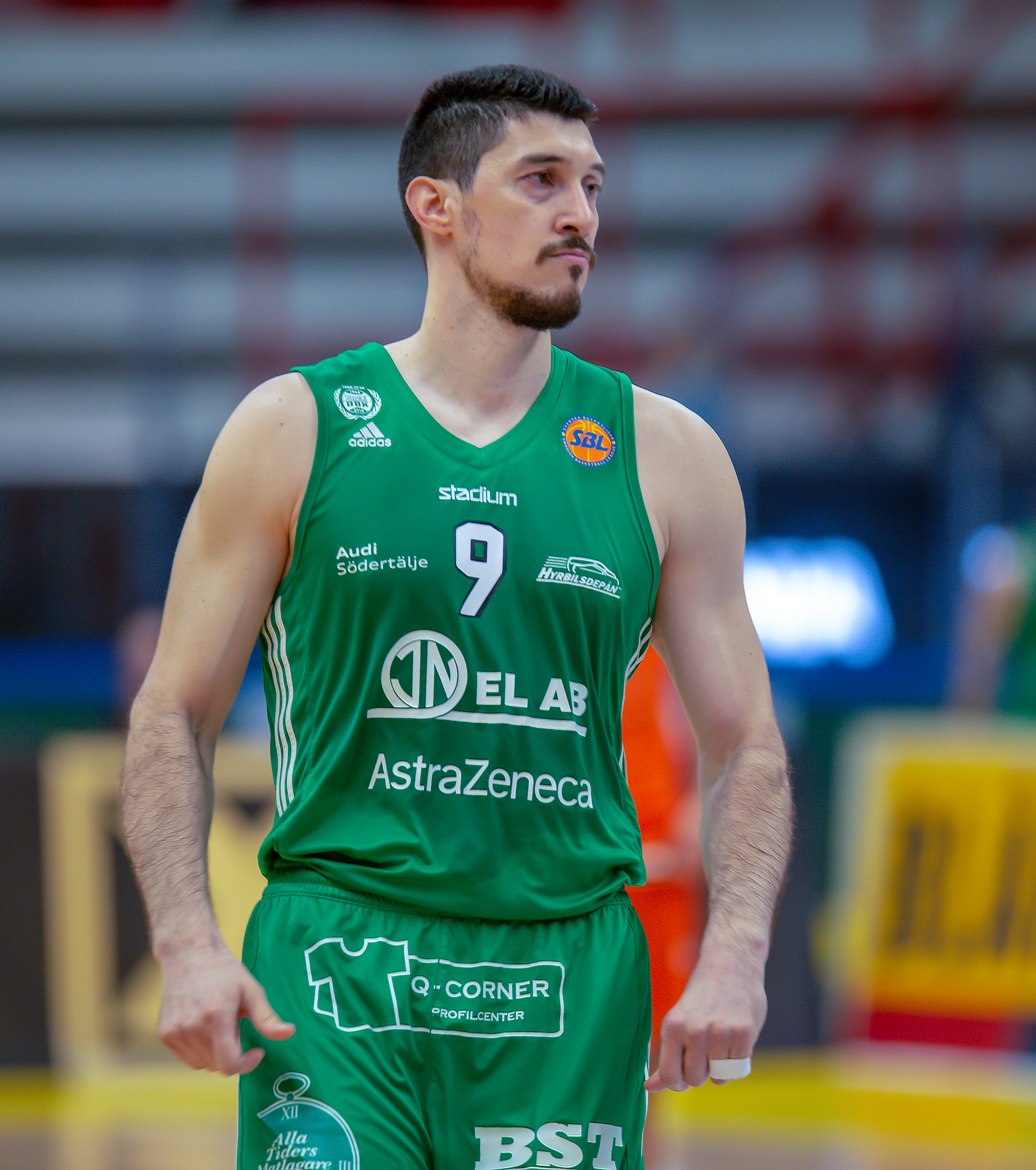
Toni Bizaca won the award two seasons in a row, in 2013 and 2014

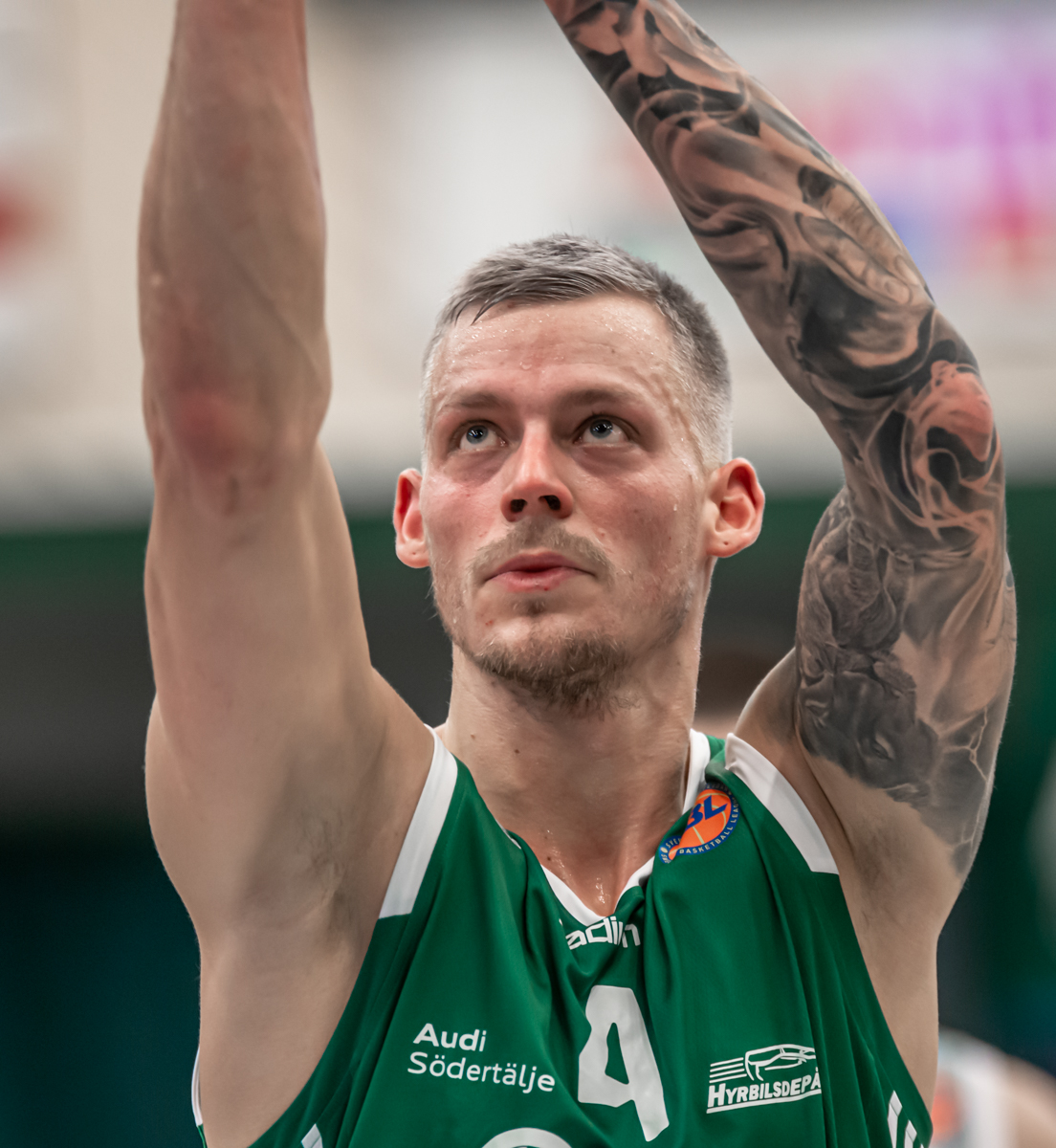
Viktor Gaddefors won the award in 2021

Season	Player	Pos.	Nationality	Team	Ref.
1992–93	Olle Håkansson	G	Sweden	Alvik Basket	
1993–94	Gerry Besselink	C	Canada	Jämtland Ambassadors	
1994–95	Per Stümer	F	Sweden	Södertälje Kings	
1995–96	Doremus Bennerman	PG	United States	Jämtland Ambassadors	
1996–97	Otis Smith	SG	United States	Solna Vikings	
1997–98	Ron Rutland	PG	United States	Solna Vikings	
1998–99	Eric Elliot	G	United States	Plannja Basket	
1999–00	Trevor Ruffin	PG	United States	Magic M7	
2000–01	Olle Håkansson (2)	G	Sweden	08 Alvik Stockholm	
2001–02	Fred Drains	F	Sweden	Norrköping Dolphins	
2002–03	Eric Talyor	G	United States	Solna Vikings	
2003–04	Gee Gervin	G	United States	Norrköping Dolphins	
2004–05	Fred Drains (2)	F	Sweden	Plannja Basket	
2005–06	Derrick Tarver	G	United States	Solna Vikings	
2006–07	Fred Drains (3)	F	Sweden	Plannja Basket	
2007–08	Joakim Kjellbom	C	Sweden	Sundsvall Dragons	
2008–09	Lesli Myrthil	F	Sweden	Solna Vikings	
2009–10	Joakim Kjellbom (2)	C	Sweden	Norrköping Dolphins	
2010–11	Alex Wesby	SG	United States	Sundsvall Dragons	
2011–12	Johnell Smith	PG	United States	Södertälje Kings	
2012–13	Toni Bizaca	SF	Croatia	Södertälje Kings	
2013–14	Toni Bizaca (2)	SF	Croatia	Södertälje Kings	
2014–15	John Roberson	PG	United States	Södertälje Kings	
2015–16	Joakim Kjellbom (3)	C	Sweden	Norrköping Dolphins	
2016–17	Joakim Kjellbom (4)	C	Sweden	Norrköping Dolphins	
2017–18	Joakim Kjellbom (5)	C	Sweden	Norrköping Dolphins	
2018–19	Nimrod Hilliard IV	PG	United States	Borås Basket	
2019–20	Brandon Rozzell	PG	United States	BC Luleå	
2020–21	Viktor Gaddefors	F	Sweden	Södertälje BBK	
2021–22	C.J Wilson	G	United States	Jämtland Basket	
2022–23	Gustav Hansson	PG	Sweden	Umeå BSKT	
2023–24	Adam Ramstedt	C	Sweden	Norrköping Dolphins	
2024–25	Marcus Tyus	G	United States	Norrköping Dolphins	
2025–26	Gustav Hansson (2)	PG	Sweden	BC Luleå	

== Players with most awards ==
Player	Editions	Notes
(Sweden) Joakim Kjellbom	5	2008, 2010, 2016, 2017, 2018
(Sweden) Gustav Hansson	2	2023, 2026
(Croatia) Toni Bizaca	2	2013, 2014
(Sweden) Olle Håkansson	2	1993, 2001
(Sweden) Fred Drains	2	2005, 2007
