= Vedran Bosnić =

Bosnian basketball player and coach

Anwil Włocławek
- Title: Head coach
- League: PLK

Personal information
- Born: 4 June 1976 (age 50) Sarajevo, SR Bosnia and Herzegovina, SFR Yugoslavia
- Listed height: 1.88 m (6 ft 2 in)
- Position: Point guard
- Coaching career: 2008–present

Career history

Playing
- 1994–1996: Šibenik
- 1996–1999: Sloboda Tuzla
- 1999–2000: Elana Toruń
- 2000: Sopron
- 2001: MAFC
- 2001–2002: Rytas
- 2002–2003: Bosna
- 2003–2004: Belenenses
- 2004–2005: Astoria Bydgoszcz
- 2005: Peja
- 2006: Grude
- 2006–2007: Uppsala Basket
- 2007–2008: Södertälje Kings

Coaching
- 2008–2010: Södertälje Kings (assistant)
- 2010–2017: Södertälje Kings
- 2014–2018: Sweden
- 2017–2019: Lions de Genève
- 2018–2022: Bosnia and Herzegovina
- 2019–2025: Union Mons-Hainaut
- 2025–2026: Szolnoki Olajbányász
- 2026–present: Anwil Włocławek

Career highlights
- As head coach: 5× Basketligan Coach of the Year (2011, 2012, 2013, 2014, 2015); 1× Pro Basketball League Coach of the year (2021); 4× Basketligan champion (2013, 2014, 2015, 2016); 2× Swiss Supercup winner (2017, 2018); 1× Swiss League Cup Winner (2018); FIBA Europe Cup Quarterfinals (with Union Mons-Hainaut 2021); FIBA Qualifying for European Championships Bosnia and Herzegovina (FIBA EuroBasket) - 2022 (Record: 5-1 No.1 position); 1× Hungarian cup 2025

Vedran Bosnić (born 4 June 1976) is a Bosnian professional basketball coach and former player. He is the current head coach for Anwil Włocławek of the Polish Basketball League (PLK).

== Career achievements ==
=== As head coach ===
- National Championships (4×):
  - Basketligan: 4 (with Södertälje Kings: 2012–13, 2013–14, 2014–15, 2015–16)
- National Super Cups (2×):
  - Swiss Supercup: 2 (with Lions de Genève: 2017, 2018)
- National League Cups (1×):
  - Swiss League Cup: 1 (with Lions de Genève: 2018 )
  - FIBA Europe Cup Quarterfinals (with

Belfius Mons-Hainaut: 2021)

  - FIBA Qualifying for European Championships Bosnia and Herzegovina (FIBA EuroBasket) - 2022 (Record: 5-1 No.1 position)
- Hungarian National Cups (1×): 2026 (with Szolnoki Olajbányász)
