= Basketligan Finals MVP =

The Basketligan Finals MVP award is handed out to the Most Valuable Player in the Finals of the Basketligan, the highest Swedish basketball tier.

== Winners ==
| Season | Player | Position | Nationality | Team | Ref. |
|---|---|---|---|---|---|
| 2011–12 | Johnell Smith | PG | United States | Södertälje Kings | |
| 2012–13 | John Roberson | PG | United States | Södertälje Kings | |
| 2013–14 | Toni Bizaca | SF | Croatia | Södertälje Kings | |
| 2014–15 | John Roberson (2) | PG | United States | Södertälje Kings | |
| 2015–16 | Skyler Bowlin | G | United States | Södertälje Kings | |
| 2016–17 | Brandon Rozzell | G | United States | BC Luleå | |
| 2020–21 | Adam Ramstedt | F | Sweden | Norrköping Dolphins | |
| 2021–22 | Felix Terins | PG | Sweden | Norrköping Dolphins | |
| 2022–23 | Devonte Green | SG | USA | Norrköping Dolphins | |
| 2023–24 | Felix Terins | PG | Sweden | Norrköping Dolphins | |
| 2024–25 | Shane Hunter | PF | USA | Norrköping Dolphins | |
| 2025–26 | KJ Jenkins | G | USA | Borås Basket | |
