= 2016–17 Basketligan season =

Basketligan
- Season: 2016–17
- Duration: 6 October 2016 – 26 March 2017 (Regular season); 31 March 2016 – 10 May 2017 (Playoffs)
- Teams: 9

Regular season
- Top seed: Luleå
- Season MVP: (Sweden) Joakim Kjellbom

Finals
- Champions: Luleå (8th title)
- Runners-up: Södertälje Kings
- Semifinalists: Norrköping Dolphins; Uppsala
- Finals MVP: (United States) Brandon Rozzell

Statistical leaders
Points	(Croatia) Toni Bizaca	17.6
Rebounds	(Sweden) Joakim Kjellbom	8.5
Assists	(United States) Jabril Durham	6.2

The 2016–17 Basketligan season was the 24th season of the Basketligan, the top tier basketball league on Sweden. The season started on 6 October 2016 and ended on May 10, 2017. Södertälje Kings was the defending champion after achieving its 11th title in the previous season. BC Luleå won the title after beating the defending champions 4–1 in the Finals.

== Competition format ==
The participating teams first play a conventional round-robin schedule with every team playing each opponent three times for a total of 30 games. The top eight teams qualified for the championship playoffs.

== Teams ==
Location of teams in the Basketligan 2016–17

In October 2016, Sundsvall Dragons and Eco Örebro were expelled from the league.

Team	City	Venue	Capacity
BC Luleå	Luleå	ARCUS Arena	1,700
Borås Basket	Borås	Boråshallen	3,000
Jämtland Basket	Östersund	Östersunds sporthall	1,250
Malbas	Malmö	Heleneholms Sporthall	Unknown
Norrköping Dolphins	Norrköping	Stadium Arena	4,500
KFUM Nässjö	Nässjö	Nässjö Sporthall	Unknown
Södertälje Kings	Södertälje	Täljehallen	2,200
Umeå BSKT	Umeå	Umeå Energi Arena	1,270
Uppsala Basket	Uppsala	Fyrishov	3,000

== Regular season ==
Pos	Team	Pld	W	L	PF	PA	PD	Pts	Qualification
1	Luleå	32	24	8	2723	2352	+371	48	Qualification to Playoffs
2	Norrköping Dolphins	32	23	9	2495	2152	+343	46	Qualification to Playoffs
3	Södertälje Kings	32	23	9	2592	2307	+285	46	Qualification to Playoffs
4	Uppsala	32	18	14	2543	2436	+107	36	Qualification to Playoffs
5	Borås	32	17	15	2546	2376	+170	34	Qualification to Playoffs
6	Jämtland	32	16	16	2753	2619	+134	32	Qualification to Playoffs
7	KFUM Nässjö	32	15	17	2388	2404	−16	30	Qualification to Playoffs
8	Umeå BSKT	32	5	27	2254	2875	−621	10	Qualification to Playoffs
9	Malbas	32	3	29	2139	2912	−773	6	

Source: Basketligan
Rules for classification: 1) Points; 2) Head-to-head results; 3) Head-to-head points ratio; 4) Total points ratio.

== Playoffs ==
Quarterfinals
1	Luleå	3
8	Umeå BSKT	0
4	Uppsala	3
5	Borås	1
2	Norrköping Dolphins	3
7	KFUM Nässjö	0
3	Södertälje Kings	3
6	Jämtland	2

Semifinals
1	Luleå	4
4	Uppsala	1
2	Norrköping Dolphins	2
3	Södertälje Kings	4

Final
1	Luleå	4
3	Södertälje Kings	1
