= Peter Cipriano =

American-Cape Verdean basketball coach

Pedro Cipriano
Saint Peter's Peacocks
- Title: Assistant coach
- League: MAAC

Personal information
- Born: February 7, 1983 (age 43) Jersey City, New Jersey, U.S.
- Listed height: 6 ft 9 in (2.06 m)
- Listed weight: 244 lb (111 kg)

Career information
- High school: St. Anthony (Jersey City, New Jersey)
- College: Southern (2002–2006)
- NBA draft: 2006: undrafted
- Playing career: 2006–2011
- Position: Power forward/center
- Number: 15, 4, 10
- Coaching career: 2013–present

Career history

Playing
- 2006–2007: BG Karlsruhe
- 2008: Kouvot
- 2008–2009: Norrköping Dolphins
- 2009: PBG Basket Poznań
- 2010–2011: Eco Örebro

Coaching
- 2013–2022: Southern (assistant)
- 2022–present: Saint Peter's (assistant)

Career highlights
- SWAC Tournament MVP (2006)

Pedro Cipriano (born February 7, 1983) is an American-Cape Verdean basketball coach and former player who is currently an assistant coach at Saint Peter's University.

== Early life ==
Born in Jersey City, New Jersey, Cipriano graduated from St. Anthony High School and played basketball at St. Anthony under coach Bob Hurley.

== Collegiate career ==
Going by "Peter", Cipriano attended and played basketball at Southern University from 2002 to 2006. As a senior on the team that won the 2006 SWAC Tournament, Cipriano had 10.2 points and 8.5 rebounds per game.

== Professional playing career ==
He played professionally from 2006 to 2011 for various European teams.

In the 2006–2007 season, he played for BG Karlsruhe of the German Basketball Bundesliga with jersey #15. He averaged 6.5 points and 5.9 rebounds per game.

Cipriano signed with Kouvot in the Finnish Korisliiga for the 2007–2008 postseason, with jersey #4. Helping Kouvot make the 2008 Korisliiga Finals, Cipriano averaged 7.7 points and 6.2 rebounds per game.

In the 2008–2009 season, Cipriano played for the Norrköping Dolphins of the Swedish Basketligan, with jersey #10. Cipriano averaged 7.0 points and 7.0 rebounds per game. The Dolphins advanced to the 2009 Basketligan semifinals.

For three games in October 2009, Cirpiano played for PBG Basket Poznań of the Polish Basketball League. Cipriano then played 11 games for Eco Örebro of Swedish Basketligan from February to March 2010 with 7.5 points and 10.0 rebounds per game. Cipriano returned to the team for the 2010–11 season, averaging 7.1 points and 7.5 rebounds per game. He wore jersey #10 with Örebro.

== International career ==
A member of the Cape Verde national basketball team, Cipriano joined Cape Verde after they won a bronze medal at the FIBA Africa Championship 2007, qualifying for a wildcard tournament for the 2008 Summer Olympics.

== Coaching career ==
After completing his bachelor's degree at Southern University in 2013, Cipriano became an assistant coach in Roman Banks's staff in the 2013–14 season.
