= James Miller (basketball) =

American professional basketball player (born 1979)

Free agent
- Position: Point guard

Personal information
- Born: August 23, 1979 (age 47) Chinquapin, North Carolina
- Listed height: 6 ft 0 in (1.83 m)
- Listed weight: 172 lb (78 kg)

Career information
- High school: East Duplin (Beulaville, North Carolina)
- College: North Carolina A&T (1997–2001)
- NBA draft: 2001: undrafted
- Playing career: 2001–present

Career history
- 2001–2002: Landstede Zwolle
- 2002–2003: Brest
- 2004: Sundsvall Dragons
- 2004: Pennsylvania ValleyDawgs
- 2004–2005: Sundsvall Dragons
- 2005: Trotamundos de Carabobo
- 2005–2006: Demon Astronauts Amsterdam
- 2006–2007: Levallois SCB
- 2007–2008: Optima Gent
- 2008–2009: Leuven Bears
- 2009–2010: STB Le Havre
- 2010–2011: Leuven Bears
- 2011–2012: Poitiers Basket 86
- 2012–2013: Borås
- 2013: Gaiteros de Zulia
- 2013–2015: Borås
- 2015: Gaiteros de Zulia
- 2016: SOMB Boulogne-sur-Mer

Career highlights
- Dutch Cup champion (2006); DBL All-Star (2006); Basketligan All-Star Game MVP (2005); 2x Basketligan Guard of the Year (2013–2014); 2x Basketligan scoring leader (2013–2014)

James Isaac "J. J." Miller, Jr. (born August 23, 1979) is an American professional basketball player. He played overseas since 2001 and has played in multiple countries, including France, the Netherlands, Belgium and Sweden. Since 2012 he is a Borås Basket player and one of the top players in the Swedish Basketligan.

He started his professional career in the Netherlands with Landstede Basketbal in 2001. After that period he played with Brest of the French LNB Pro B and in his home country for the Pennsylvania ValleyDawgs. He also played for the Sundsvall Dragons from 2004 till 2005. In the 2005–06 season he played with Demon Astronauts Amsterdam and won the NBB Cup with Amsterdam. He was one of the top scorers in the Eredivisie with 17.6 points per game.

In 2012 Miller returned to Sweden, this time to play for Borås Basket. From that moment, Miller was one of the top tier players in the Swedish Basketligan. He led the league in scoring in the 2012–13 and 2013–14 seasons with 21.6 and 23.7, respectively, points per game.

Miller has also played for Levallois SCB, Optima Gent, Leuven Bears, STB Le Havre and Poitiers Basket 86 under his career.

== Career statistics ==
Legend
GP	Games played	MPG	Minutes per game	FG%	Field goal percentage
3P%	3-point field goal percentage	FT%	Free throw percentage	RPG	Rebounds per game
APG	Assists per game	SPG	Steals per game	BPG	Blocks per game
PPG	Points per game	**Bold**	Career high		Led the league

†	Denotes seasons in which Miller's team won the league

=== Domestic ===
Year	Team	League	GP	MPG	FG%	3P%	FT%	RPG	APG	SPG	BPG	PPG	
2005-06	Amsterdam	Eredivise	25		34.2	.492	.409	.769	3.4	3.1	**2.2**	.0	17.6
2006-07	Levallois	LNB Pro B	34		33.0	.416	.338	.793	3.0	3.2	1.4	.0	14.2
2007-08	Gent	BLB Division 1	33		32.3	.441	.313	.808	2.6	2.2	1.5	.0	17.2
2009-10	Le Havre	LNB Pro A	30		32.3	.428	.336	.833	1.8	3.8	1.5	.0	14.0
2010-11	Leuven	BLB Division 1	34		33.0	.468	.408	.780	2.3	2.7	1.4	.1	15.1
2011-12	Poitiers	LNB Pro A	26		24.8	.381	.357	.833	1.8	2.4	1.0	.1	10.3
2012-13	Borås	Basketligan	32		**36.3**	.472	**.417**	.840	3.2	**6.1**	.9	.1	21.6
2013-14	Borås	Basketligan	**36**		35.3	**.493**	.401	**.864**	**4.2**	3.8	1.1	.1	**23.7**
2014-15	Borås	Basketligan	34		31.9	.486	.367	.795	2.4	4.5	1.0	**.2**	17.7

== Honours ==
Club
(Netherlands)	NBB Cup	1	2006
Individual
(Netherlands)	DBL All-Star	1	2006
(Sweden)	Ligan Guard of the Year	2	2013, 2014
(Sweden)	Ligan All-Star Game MVP	1	2005
