= Dino Pita =

Swedish basketball player

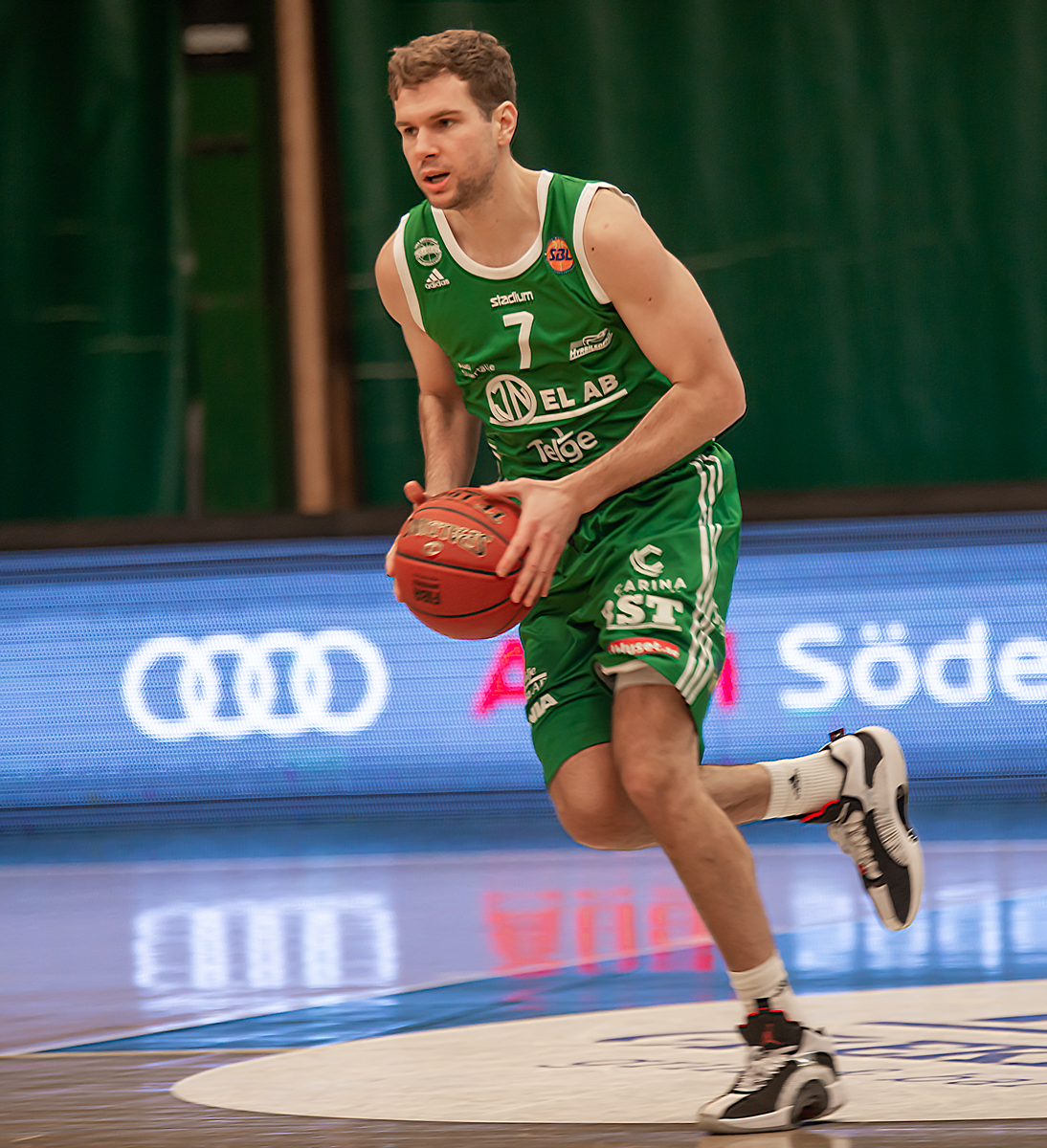
- Pita playing with Södertälje in 2021

No. 7 – Södertälje BBK
- Position: Shooting guard
- League: Swedish Basketball League

Personal information
- Born: September 20, 1988 (age 38) Foča, Yugoslavia
- Listed height: 6 ft 4 in (1.93 m)
- Listed weight: 190 lb (86 kg)

Career information
- NBA draft: 2010: undrafted
- Playing career: 2007–present

Career history
- 2007–2013: Södertälje Kings
- 2013–2015: Liège
- 2015–2016: Södertälje Kings
- 2016: Brussels
- 2017–2018: Miasto Szkła Krosno
- 2018–2020: Juventus Utena
- 2020-present: Södertälje BBK

Career highlights
- 2× Basketligan champion (2013, 2016)

Dino Pita (born September 20, 1988) is a Swedish undrafted basketball player that plays for Södertälje BBK. Pita is a 1.93 m (6 ft 4 in) shooting guard.

== Honours ==
- Basketligan (2): 2013, 2016
