= Omar Krayem =

American-Palestinian basketball player

No. 4 – Mineros de Zacatecas
- Position: Point guard

Personal information
- Born: October 12, 1988 (age 38) Los Angeles, California
- Listed height: 6 ft 0 in (1.83 m)
- Listed weight: 180 lb (82 kg)

Career information
- High school: Modesto (Modesto, California)
- College: Lower Columbia (2004–2006); Eastern Washington (2006–2007); California Baptist (2008–2009)
- NBA draft: 2009: undrafted
- Playing career: 2009–present

Career history
- 2011–2012: Borås
- 2012: Stockholm Eagles
- 2012–2013: Egis Körmend
- 2013–2014: Tapiolan Honka
- 2014–2015: Umeå
- 2015: GlobalPort Batang Pier
- 2015: Mineros de Caborca
- 2015–2016: Borås
- 2017: Prievidza
- 2017–2018: STB Le Havre
- 2018–2021: Umeå
- 2020–2021: SKN St. Pölten
- 2021: Leñadores de Durango
- 2022: Academic Plovdiv
- 2023–: Mineros de Zacatecas

Career highlights
- LNBP assists leader (2021); FIBA Europe Cup scoring leader (2016); Basketligan scoring champion (2015); Basketligan assists leader (2015)

Omar Nabil Krayem (born October 12, 1988) is a Los-Angeles born American-Palestinian professional basketball player who currently plays for Mineros de Zacatecas of the Mexican League. Standing at 183 cm (6 ft), Krayem plays as point guard. In the 2015–16 season, Krayem led the FIBA Europe Cup in scoring with 20.4 PPG and he was second in assist at 6.6 per contest while leading Borås Basket to the second stage of the FEC.
