= 2014–15 EuroChallenge Group A =

Basketball tournament group stage

Group A of the 2014–15 EuroChallenge consisted of SPM Shoeters Den Bosch, Södertälje Kings, ratiopharm Ulm, and Enel Basket Brindisi. Play began on 4 November and ended on 16 December 2014.

== Teams ==
Draw seed	Team	City	Country	Last appearance	2013–14			Arena	Capacity
Draw seed	Team	City	Country	Last appearance	League	Pos.	Playoffs	Arena	Capacity
I	Södertälje Kings	Södertälje	Sweden	2013–14	Basketligan	1st	C	Täljehallen	2,000
II	SPM Shoeters Den Bosch	's-Hertogenbosch	Netherlands	2013–14	DBL	2nd	RU	Maaspoort Sports and Events	2,800
III	ratiopharm Ulm	Ulm	Germany	—N/a	BBL	6th	QF	ratiopharm Arena	6,000
IV	Enel Brindisi	Brindisi	Italy	—N/a	Serie A	5th	QF	PalaPentassuglia	3,523

== Standings ==
Pos	Team	Pld	W	L	PF	PA	PD	Pts	BRI	SPM	ULM	SÖD
1	(Italy) Enel Brindisi (Q)	6	5	1	496	400	+96	11		76–62	88–70	90–69
2	(Netherlands) SPM Shoeters Den Bosch (Q)	6	3	3	498	499	−1	9 (Note: Head-to-head: 1–1 (+6))	71–69		87–76	88–72
3	(Germany) ratiopharm Ulm	6	3	3	477	467	+10	9 (Note: Head-to-head: 1–1 (–6))	76–77	91–82		88–62
4	(Sweden) Södertälje Kings	6	1	5	441	546	−105	7	52–96	115–108	71–76	

(Q) Qualify for Top 16

== Results ==
=== Round 1 ===
4 November 2014
19:00

Boxscore

Södertälje Kings (Sweden)	71–76	(Germany) ratiopharm Ulm
Pts: Toni Bizaca 28; Rebs: Darko Jukic 5 Asts: Uros Zadnik 5		Pts: Tim Ohlbrecht 20; Rebs: Adam Hess 10; Asts: Per Günther 10

Täljehallen, Södertälje
Attendance: 605

4 November 2014
20:00

Boxscore

SPM Shoeters Den Bosch (Netherlands)	71–69	(Italy) Enel Basket Brindisi
Scoring by quarter: 25–10, 15–14, 19–22, 12–23
Pts: Reggie Johnson 23; Rebs: Stefan Wessels 8 Asts: four players 3		Pts: Elston Turner 17; Rebs: Deyan Ivanov 10; Asts: Seketoure Henry 4

Maaspoort Sports and Events, 's-Hertogenbosch
Attendance: 2,000

=== Round 2 ===
12 November 2014
19:30

Boxscore

ratiopharm Ulm (Germany)	91–82	(Netherlands) SPM Shoeters Den Bosch
Pts: Will Clyburn 15; Rebs: Boris Savovic 6 Asts: Per Günther 5		Pts: Brandyn Curry 26; Rebs: Reggie Johnson 6 Asts: Reggie Johnson 5

ratiopharm Arena, Ulm
Attendance: 4,500

12 November 2014
20:45

Boxscore

Enel Basket Brindisi (Italy)	90–69	(Sweden) Södertälje Kings
Pts: Delroy James 21; Rebs: Deyan Ivanov 10; Asts: Marcus Denmon 6		Pts: Darko Jukic 17; Rebs: Dino Butorac 4 Asts: Toni Bizaca 3

PalaPentassuglia, Brindisi
Attendance: 2,500

=== Round 3 ===
18 November 2014
20:00

Boxscore

SPM Shoeters Den Bosch (Netherlands)	88–72	(Sweden) Södertälje Kings
Scoring by quarter: 21–24, 24–25, 21–12, 22–11
Pts: Reggie Johnson 20; Rebs: Reggie Johnson 10; Asts: Brandyn Curry 5		Pts: Toni Bizaca 20; Rebs: Jukic & Anderson 4 Asts: Jukic & Zadnik 3

Maaspoort Sports and Events, 's-Hertogenbosch
Attendance: 2,000
Referees: Manuel Mazzoni (ITA), Vilius Maciulaitis (LTU), Mehdi Difallah (FRA)

19 November 2014
19:30

Boxscore

ratiopharm Ulm (Germany)	76–77	(Italy) Enel Basket Brindisi
Scoring by quarter: 9-25, 29-15, 19-16, 19-21
Pts: Leunen & Hess 12; Rebs: Will Clyburn 11; Asts: Per Günther 5		Pts: Marcus Denmon 31; Rebs: Cedric Simmons 12; Asts: Demonte Harper 3

ratiopharm Arena, Ulm
Attendance: 4,500
Referees: Ognjen Jokic (MNE), Marek Maliszewski (POL), Pedro Coelho (POR)

=== Round 4 ===
3 December 2014
19:30

Boxscore

ratiopharm Ulm (Germany)	88–62	(Sweden) Södertälje Kings
Scoring by quarter: 26-17, 20-10, 25-23, 17-12
Pts: Will Clyburn 18; Rebs: Ohlbrecht & Maier 6 Asts: Per Günther 7		Pts: Toni Bizaca 21; Rebs: Toni Bizaca 8 Asts: Uros Zadnik 5

ratiopharm Arena, Ulm
Attendance: 4,500
Referees: Zoran Sutulovic (MNE), Wojciech Liszka (POL), Zafer Yilmaz (TUR)

3 December 2014
20:45

Boxscore

Enel Basket Brindisi (Italy)	76–62	(Netherlands) SPM Shoeters Den Bosch
Scoring by quarter: 21-22, 20-10, 20-12, 15-18
Pts: Marcus Denmon 20; Rebs: Cedric Simmons 8 Asts: Delroy James 5		Pts: Chris Denson 17; Rebs: Stefan Wessels 9 Asts: Stefan Wessels 4

PalaPentassuglia, Brindisi
Attendance: 2,922
Referees: Antonis Demetriou (CYP), Tamas Benczur (HUN), Georgios Poursanidis (GRE)

=== Round 5 ===
9 December 2014
19:30

Boxscore

Södertälje Kings (Sweden)	52–96	(Italy) Enel Basket Brindisi
Scoring by quarter: 2-20, 14-31, 10-28, 16-17
Pts: Toni Bizaca 15; Rebs: Toni Bizaca 10; Asts: Toni Bizaca 4		Pts: Marcus Denmon 20; Rebs: James Mays 10; Asts: David Cournooh 4

Täljehallen, Södertälje
Attendance: 687

9 December 2014
20:00

Boxscore

SPM Shoeters Den Bosch (Netherlands)	87–76	(Germany) ratiopharm Ulm
Scoring by quarter: 28-12, 11-15, 25-27, 23-22
Pts: Chris Denson 27; Rebs: Stefan Wessels 8 Asts: Ralf de Pagter 4		Pts: Ohlbrecht, Clyburn 13; Rebs: Ohlbrecht 9 Asts: Günther 5

Maaspoort Sports and Events, 's-Hertogenbosch
Attendance: 3,000
Referees: Paulo Marques (POR), Boris Krejic (SLO), Mehdi Difallah (FRA)

=== Round 6 ===
16 December 2014
19:00

Boxscore

Södertälje Kings (Sweden)	113–108 (2OT)	(Netherlands) SPM Shoeters Den Bosch
Scoring by quarter: 19-16, 21-20, 25-27, 19-21, Overtime: 15-15, 16-9
Pts: Darko Jukic 29; Rebs: Darko Jukic 6 Asts: Uros Zadnik 10		Pts: Stefan Wessels 28; Rebs: Stefan Wessels 19; Asts: Chris Denson 3

Täljehallen, Södertälje
Attendance: 467
Referees: Janusz Calik (POL), Aliaksandr Syrytsa (BLR), Ivor Matejek (CZE)

16 December 2014
20:45

Boxscore

Enel Basket Brindisi (Italy)	88–70	(Germany) ratiopharm Ulm
Scoring by quarter: 24-16, 26-16, 18-26, 20-12
Pts: Jacob Pullen 25; Rebs: James Mays 9 Asts: Jacob Pullen 5		Pts: Jaka Klobucar 17; Rebs: William Clyburn 5 Asts: Per Günther 4

PallaPentassuglia, Brindisi
Attendance: 2,370
Referees: Francisco Araña (ESP), Erez Gurion (ISR), Paul Walton (ENG)

== Statistical leaders ==
	(Netherlands) SPM Shoeters	(Italy) Enel Brindisi	(Germany) ratiopharm Ulm	(Sweden) Södertälje Kings
PPG	(United States) Chris Denson (17.2)	(United States) Marcus Denmon (18.0)	(United States) Will Clyburn (12.2)	(Croatia) Toni Bizaca (20.0)
RPG	(Netherlands) Stefan Wessels (8.3)	(Bulgaria) Dejan Ivanov (8.3)	(United States) Will Clyburn (6.5)	(Croatia) Toni Bizaca (4.5)
APG	(Netherlands) Arvin Slagter (2.7)	(United States) Jacob Pullen (4.0)	(Germany) Per Günther (6.0)	(Slovenia) Uros Zadnik (4.3)
