= A3 Basket =

- Leagues: Basketligan dam
- Founded: 2012
- History: Umeå BBK (2012–?); Udominate Basket ?-2018; A3 Basket 2018-
- Arena: Umeå Energi Arena
- Capacity: 1700
- Location: Umeå, Sweden
- Team colors: Green, White
- Main sponsor: A3
- President: Charlotta Enjebo (klubbdirektör); Peder Westerberg (ordförande)
- Team manager: Jan Enjebo
- Assistant: Mikael Blomqvist
- Website: a3basket.se

A3 Basket is a women's basketball club in Umeå, Sweden. The club was established with the 2012 squad from KFUM Umeå women's basketball section "Umeå Comets" after the club had decided to discontinue their women's team. A new club was formed under the name Umeå BasketBollklubb (Umeå BBK). Debuting in Basketligan dam during the 2012–13 season, the team ended up fifth and made it to the semifinals, before losing to the Norrköping Dolphins. The club also plays in the BWBL.

== Name ==
The official association name (föreningsnamn) is still Umeå BasketBollklubb (Umeå BBK) but the name rights has been sold twice. As the main sponsor for Umeå BBK, the company UDOMiNATE Sweden AB made a deal with Umeå BBK about its name and during most of the 2010s the club has been known as Udominate Basket. In 2018 however the telecom company A3 Sverige AB bought the name rights and the club has since been known as A3 Basket.

== Season by season ==
Season	Tier	League	Pos.
2012–13	2	Basketettan dam	5th
2013–14	2	Basketettan dam	2nd
2014–15	1	Basketligan dam	3rd
2015–16	1	Basketligan dam	11th
2016–17	1	Basketligan dam	8th
2017–18	1	Basketligan dam	6th
2018–19	1	Basketligan dam	8th
