= Liam Rush =

Australian former professional basketball player

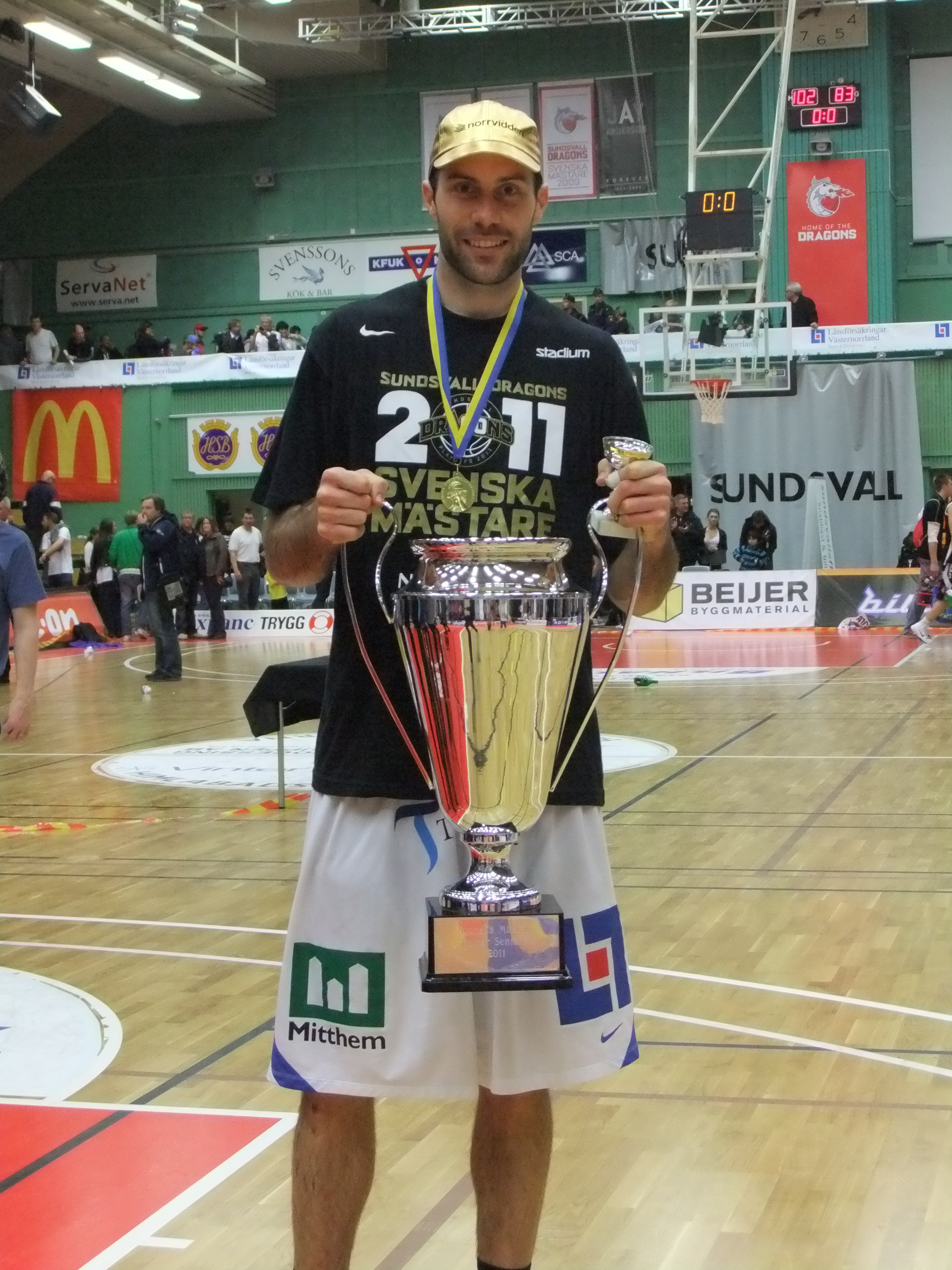
- Rush in May 2011

Personal information
- Born: 29 January 1982 (age 44) Broome, Western Australia, Australia
- Listed height: 203 cm (6 ft 8 in)
- Listed weight: 95 kg (209 lb)

Career information
- Playing career: 2000–2015
- Position: Forward

Career history
- 2000–2001: Lakeside Lightning
- 2002–2004: Cockburn Cougars
- 2003–2006: Perth Wildcats
- 2006: Willetton Tigers
- 2006–2008: West Sydney Razorbacks / Sydney Spirit
- 2008: Lakeside Lightning
- 2008–2009: Sundsvall Dragons
- 2009–2010: Gothia Basket
- 2010–2011: Sundsvall Dragons
- 2011–2013: Melbourne Tigers
- 2013–2015: Uppsala Basket

Career highlights
- 2× Basketligan champion (2009, 2011); Basketligan All-Star (2011); NBL Most Improved Player (2007)

Liam George Rush (born 29 January 1982) is an Australian former professional basketball player who spent the majority of his 15-year career playing in the Australian National Basketball League and Swedish Basketligan. In Sweden, he helped Sundsvall Dragons win championships in 2009 and 2011.

== Early life and career ==
Rush was born in Broome, Western Australia.

Rush debuted in the State Basketball League (SBL) in 2000. He played for the Lakeside Lightning in 2000 and 2001, and then played for the Cockburn Cougars in 2002 and 2003. He played a third season with the Cougars in 2004.

== Professional career ==
=== Perth Wildcats (2003–2006) ===
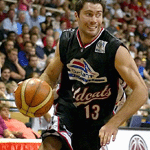
Rush during his three-year tenure with the Wildcats

Rush started his professional career in 2003 with the Perth Wildcats of the National Basketball League (NBL). He played 19 games for the Wildcats during his rookie season in 2003/04, averaging 3.4 points per game. He went on to average 5.3 points in 2004/05 and 5.8 points in 2005/06. Following the 2005/06 NBL season, Rush had a stint in the SBL with the Willetton Tigers.

=== West Sydney Razorbacks / Sydney Spirit (2006–2008) ===
In 2006, Rush joined the West Sydney Razorbacks. In February 2007, Rush was named the recipient of the NBL Most Improved Player Award. Rush's regular season scoring average increased from 6.0 points per game in 2005/06 to 14.7 in 2006/07, while his rebounds doubled from 2.9 per game in 2005/06 to 5.6 per game in 2006/07. Rush also improved his scoring accuracy from 42% to 58% from the field, and from 28% to 47% from the three-point line. He was ranked fourth in the league from long distance during the regular season.

In 2007/08, Rush averaged 13.4 points, 5.5 rebounds, 2.7 assists and 1.4 steals in 29 games. Following the 2007/08 NBL season, Rush had a stint in the SBL with the Lakeside Lightning.

In 2008, the Razorbacks changed their name to the Sydney Spirit in a bid to broaden their supporter base after the collapse of the Sydney Kings. However, with reduced crowd numbers and a poor win–loss record, the Spirit reportedly faced million-dollar losses just two months into the season. As a result, Sydney Spirit owner Greg Evans placed the team into administration in late November 2008. Rush subsequently left the Spirit in early December after appearing in 15 games to begin the 2008/09 season.

=== Sundsvall Dragons and Gothia Basket (2008–2011) ===
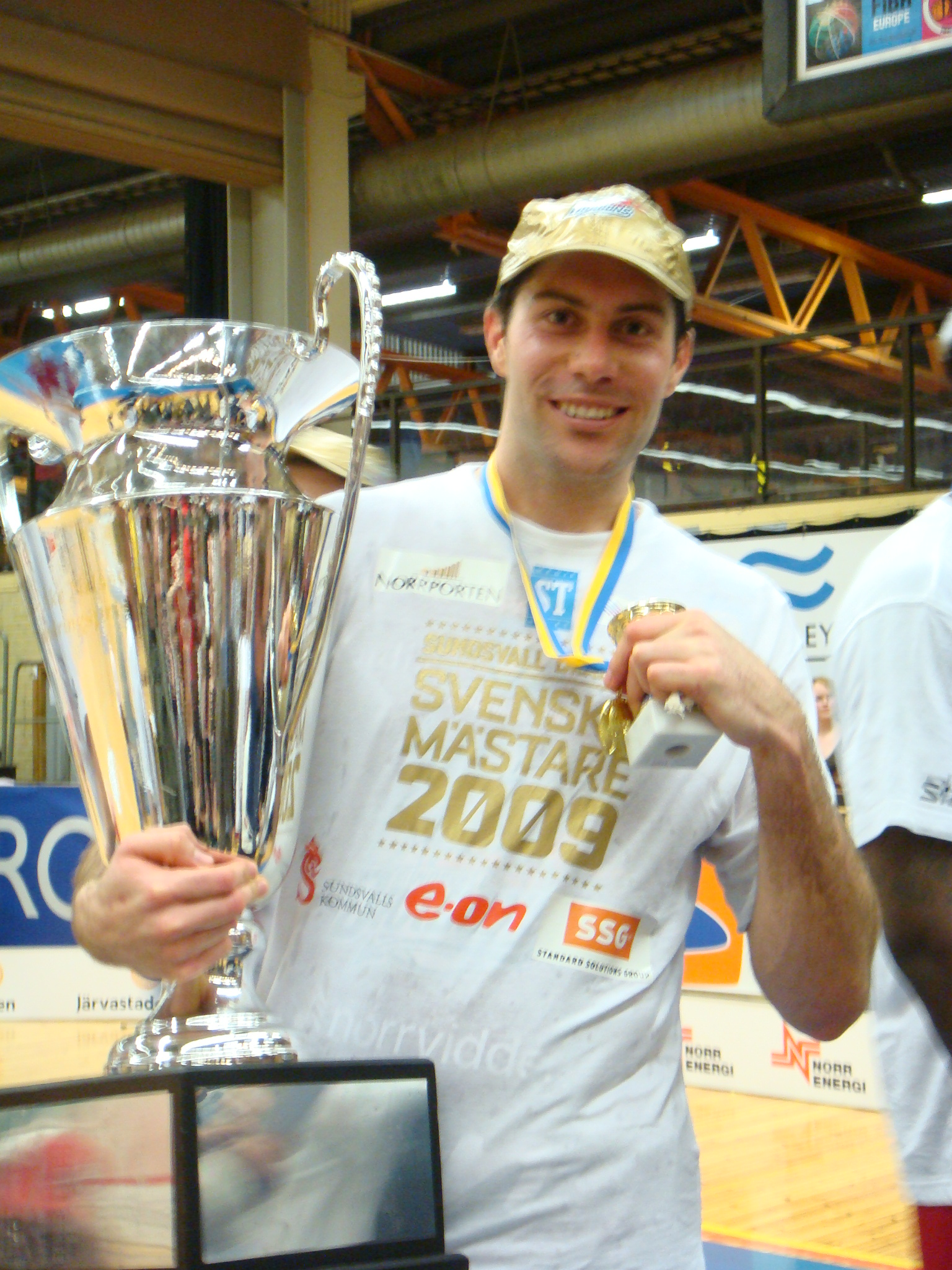
Rush in May 2009

On 12 December 2008, after exercising an out-clause in his contract with the Sydney Spirit, Rush signed with Swedish team Sundsvall Dragons for the rest of the 2008/09 Basketligan season. The Dragons had lost nine straight games and were second from the bottom when Rush arrived. His arrival sparked a turnaround that saw the Dragons claw their way to the top of the ladder and make the final play-off series. A victory over Solna Vikings, the reigning champions, was enough to bring the title to Sundsvall for the first time. Rush was the top scorer in the final game with 23 points.

In November 2009, after failing to get a contract in a major professional league, Rush signed with fellow Swedish team Gothia Basket. In March 2010, he was ruled out for the rest of the season with a wrist injury. In 16 games for Gothia, he averaged 19.0 points, 8.4 rebounds, 2.9 assists, 1.1 steals and 1.2 blocks per game.

In April 2010, Sundsvall Dragons expressed interest in bringing Rush back to the team for the 2010/11 season. Three months later, he signed a two-year deal to return to Sundsvall. In 2011, Rush played in the Basketligan All-Star Game and helped Sundsvall win their second title in three years.

=== Melbourne Tigers (2011–2013) ===
In May 2011, Rush signed a three-year deal with the Melbourne Tigers, returning to Australia and the NBL for the first time since 2008. In 2011/12, Rush averaged 8.0 points and 3.6 rebounds in 26 games for the Tigers. The following season, he averaged 5.6 points in 25 games—his lowest mark since the 2004/05 season. He had his 2012/13 season interrupted by injury and he missed most of December.

=== Uppsala Basket (2013–2015) ===
In July 2013, Rush was released by the Tigers and signed a two-year contract with Uppsala Basket. In September 2013, Rush helped Uppsala win the Nordic Cup. In 37 games for Uppsala in 2013/14, he average 14.6 points, 5.2 rebounds and 1.1 assists per game.

Rush returned to Uppsala for a second season, but managed just eight games in 2014/15. On 14 November 2014, he injured his knee against Norrköping Dolphins and was placed on a four-week rehabilitation program. By mid-December, the injury had not improved, and as a result, his timetable for a return was pushed back to January. By late January, the team committed to bringing in a replaced for Rush, as they signed American Dwight Burke for the rest of the season. Uppsala went on to reach their first ever Basketligan Finals series, where they were defeat 4–3 by Södertälje Kings.

== National team career ==
In 2009, Rush was a member of the Australian national team. In August of that year, he helped Australia win gold at the Stanković Cup in China.

== Personal ==
In December 2011, Rush's wife, Amy, gave birth to the couple's first child, a daughter named Layla.
