= Kodi Augustus =

American professional basketball player

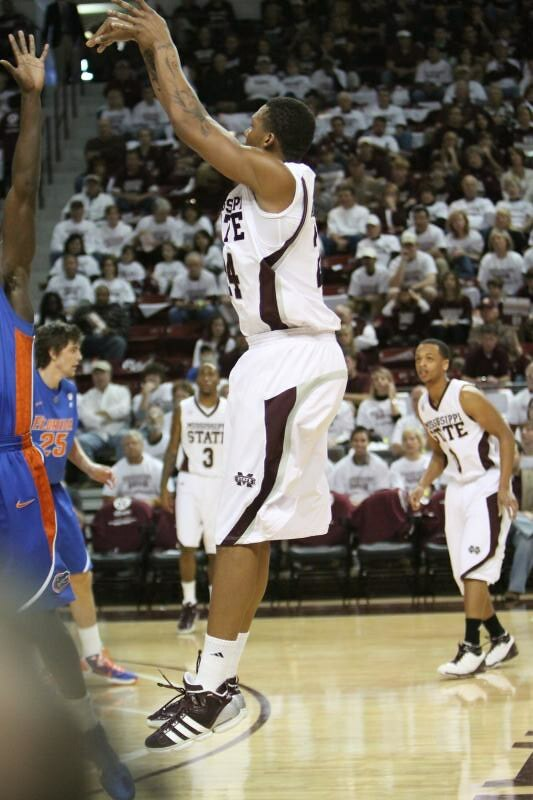
- Augustus in January 2011

Personal information
- Born: November 2, 1987 (age 39) Baton Rouge, Louisiana
- Listed height: 6 ft 8 in (2.03 m)
- Listed weight: 224 lb (102 kg)

Career information
- High school: Tara (Baton Rouge, Louisiana); Willowridge (Houston, Texas); Maine Central Institute (Pittsfield, Maine)
- College: Mississippi State (2007–2011)
- NBA draft: 2011: undrafted
- Playing career: 2011–2016
- Position: Power forward

Career history
- 2011: Hebraica Macabi
- 2012: Ballarat Miners
- 2012–2013: 08 Stockholm
- 2013: Union Olimpija
- 2014: LF Basket
- 2014: Idaho Stampede
- 2015: Ballarat Miners
- 2016: Atlético Echagüe

Career highlights
- Basketligan Forward of the Year (2013)

Kodi Jerome Augustus (born November 2, 1987) is an American former professional basketball player. He played college basketball for Mississippi State.

== High school career ==
Augustus originally attended Tara High School in his hometown of Baton Rouge, Louisiana before transferring to Willowridge High School in Houston, Texas for his junior season. As a junior in 2005–06, he averaged 16.9 points, 7.8 rebounds and 2.1 blocks per game as he earned first-team All-District 20-5A honors. He was also selected to the 2006 Houston Area Basketball Coaches Association All-Star Game, and was rated seventh among Texas recruits by Rivals.com in 2006.

In November 2006, Augustus signed a National Letter of Intent to play college basketball for Mississippi State University.

As a senior at Maine Central Institute in 2006–07, Augustus averaged a team-leading 18.9 points, along with seven rebounds and three blocks per game for coach Dave Campbell. He started all 29 games for the Huskies and recorded six double-doubles during the campaign. His best game of the season came against Lee Academy when he recorded 30 points and 22 rebounds. Following the season, he was rated as the nation's No. 20 post-graduate player by Scout.com.

== College career ==
As a freshman at Mississippi State in 2007–08, Augustus averaged 1.5 points and 1.1 rebounds per game in 11 brief appearances (4.7 mpg). He did not see game action in the last 16 contests as his final appearance for the season came on January 26 against Ole Miss.

As a sophomore in 2008–09, Augustus started the first nine games of the season for the Bulldogs before moving back to a bench role for the rest of the season. He played a further 16 games off the bench while also registering a "DNP" in 11 games. On the season, he averaged 6.2 points and 3.4 rebounds per game, and was second on the team at the free throw line with a 79.2 percent accuracy (42-of-53).

As a junior in 2009–10, Augustus appeared in 34 games with 33 starting assignments. On November 17, 2009, four days after the Bulldogs' season opening 74–88 loss to Rider, Augustus was suspended for two games after he criticized head coach Rick Stansbury after the game for his lack of playing time and how he thought the Bulldogs were outcoached by Rider. He returned to face Texas–Pan American on November 24. He went on to record a season-high 17 points three times and a season-high 16 rebounds against Houston on December 19. On the season, he averaged 8.9 points and 5.4 rebounds per game.

As a senior in 2010–11, Augustus started all 31 games while averaging 12.2 points, 7.2 rebounds, 1.6 assists and 1.0 blocks in 31.5 minutes per game. On November 19, 2010, he scored a career-high 26 points in the 76–74 win over Appalachian State.

=== College statistics ===
Year	Team	GP	GS	MPG	FG%	3P%	FT%	RPG	APG	SPG	BPG	PPG
2007–08	Mississippi State	11	0	4.7	.385	.286	.571	1.1	.2	.1	.3	1.5
2008–09	Mississippi State	25	9	13.1	.481	.323	.792	3.4	.3	.3	.3	6.2
2009–10	Mississippi State	34	33	22.5	.404	.368	.780	5.4	.8	.5	.9	8.9
2010–11	Mississippi State	31	31	31.5	.447	.309	.826	7.2	1.6	.5	1.0	12.2
Career		101	73	21.0	.435	.335	.799	5.0	.9	.4	.7	8.4

== Professional career ==
=== 2011–12 season ===
In August 2011, Augustus signed with Hebraica Macabi of Uruguay for the 2011–12 season. In December 2011, he left Hebraica after appearing in 17 games.

On March 16, 2012, Augustus signed with the Ballarat Miners for the 2012 SEABL season. He broke his right arm after appearing in five games and he subsequently returned to the United States for recovery and rehab.

=== 2012–13 season ===
In August 2012, Augustus signed a one-year deal with 08 Stockholm of the Swedish Basketligan. He went on to earn the league's Forward of the Year award after averaging 17.1 points and 5.6 rebounds per game.

=== 2013–14 season ===
On August 10, 2013, Augustus signed with Union Olimpija of Slovenia for the 2013–14 season. On December 24, 2013, he parted ways with Olimpija after appearing in nine Adriatic League and eight Eurocup games.

On January 6, 2014, Augustus signed with LF Basket for the rest of the season, returning to the Basketligan for a second stint.

=== 2014–15 season ===
On November 1, 2014, Augustus was selected by the Idaho Stampede in the third round of the 2014 NBA Development League Draft. On November 28, 2014, he was waived by the Stampede after appearing in four games.

On December 17, 2014, Augustus signed with the Ballarat Miners for the 2015 SEABL season, returning to the club for a second stint. However, his stint last just half the season, as he was released by the Miners on June 1 after the club felt he was not the right fit for the program. In 11 games for the Miners in 2015, he averaged 18.5 points, 8.4 rebounds and 1.0 assists per game.

=== 2015–16 season ===
On January 10, 2016, Augustus signed with Caballeros de Culiacán of Mexico for the 2016 CIBACOPA season. However, due to a strained left calf, he never made it onto the court with Culiacán.

=== 2016–17 season ===
In August 2016, Augustus signed with Atlético Echagüe of Argentina for the 2016–17 LNB season. He left the team in October after appearing in nine games; he averaged 9.0 points and 2.9 rebounds per game.

== Personal ==
Augustus is the son of Troy and Georgiana Carter. He is the cousin of WNBA standout and former LSU All-American, Seimone Augustus.
