= Jeffrey Viggiano =

American-born Italian basketball player

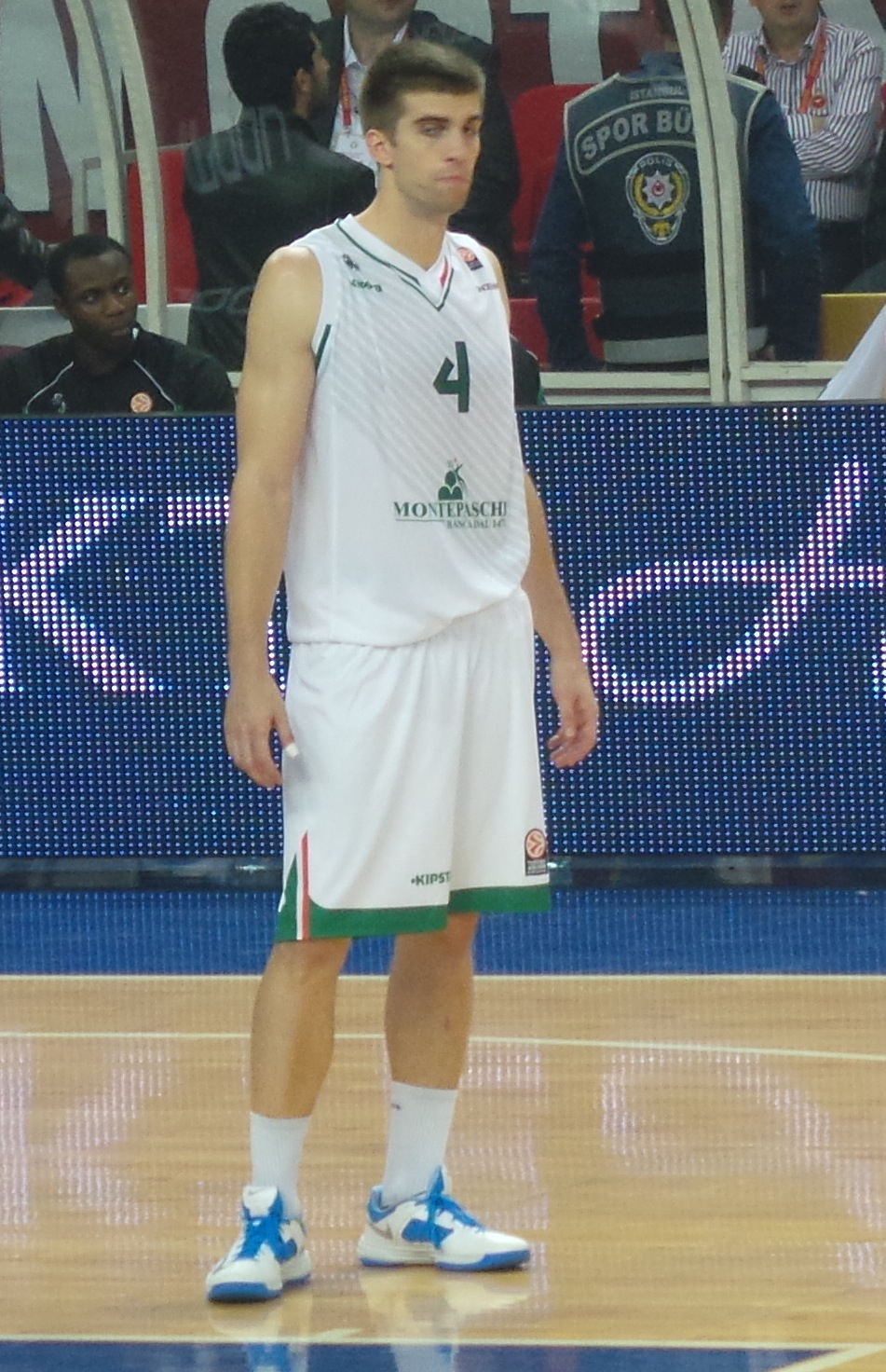

Personal information
- Born: July 24, 1984 (age 42) Hartford, Connecticut, U.S.
- Listed height: 6 ft 6 in (1.98 m)
- Listed weight: 217 lb (98 kg)

Career information
- High school: Suffield (West Suffield, Connecticut)
- College: UMass (2002–2006)
- NBA draft: 2006: undrafted
- Playing career: 2006–2017
- Position: Small forward

Career history
- 2006–2007: Norrköping Dolphins
- 2007–2008: Soproni Sördögök
- 2008–2009: Nuova Pallacanestro Pavia
- 2009–2010: Armani Jeans Milano
- 2010–2011: Angelico Biella
- 2011: Emporio Armani Milano
- 2011–2012: Benetton Treviso
- 2012–2013: Enel Brindisi
- 2013–2014: Montepaschi Siena
- 2014–2017: Umana Reyer Venezia

Career highlights
- Italian League champion (2017); Italian Supercup winner (2013)

Jeffrey Donald Viggiano (born July 24, 1984) is a retired American-born Italian professional basketball player who last played for Umana Reyer Venezia of the Lega Basket Serie A.

== High school and college career ==
Viggiano played high school basketball at Suffield, in West Suffield, Connecticut. In high school, Viggiano won the 2000 Gatorade Player of the Year in the state of Connecticut, as well as the Connecticut State Championship alongside teammate Dan Presser. He then played 4 seasons of college basketball at the University of Massachusetts Amherst, with the UMass Minutemen.

== Club career ==
After he played in Sweden and Hungary with Norrköping Dolphins and Soproni Sördögök KC, in 2008 Jeff was signed by Italian LegADue team Nuova Pallacanestro Pavia. That year he averaged 14.1 points and 4.2 rebounds per game and gained the call of powerhouse Armani Jeans Milano. In August 2010, he goes on one-year loan to Angelico Biella. In December 2011 he signed with Benetton Treviso. In July 2012, he signed a one-year deal with Enel Brindisi.

On August 30, 2013, he signed with Montepaschi Siena for the 2013–14 season. On July 1, 2014, he signed with Umana Reyer Venezia for the 2014–15 season. On July 16, 2015, he re-signed with Venezia for one more season. On July 1, 2016, he again re-signed with Venezia.
