= 2014–15 Basketligan season =

Basketligan
- Duration: September 30, 2014 – April 29, 2015
- Games played: 34
- Teams: 11

Regular season
- Top seed: Södertälje Kings
- Season MVP: (United States) John Roberson

Finals
- Champions: Södertälje Kings (10th title)
- Runners-up: Uppsala
- Finals MVP: (United States) John Roberson

Statistical leaders
Points	(Palestine) Omar Krayem	20.7
Rebounds	(United States) Germain Jordan	11.3
Assists	(Palestine) Omar Krayem	7.1

The 2014–15 Basketligan season was the 22nd season of the Basketligan, the highest professional basketball league in Sweden. Södertälje Kings successfully defended their title by winning the Finals 4–1 over Uppsala.

== Regular season ==
Pos	Team	W	L	PCT	GP	Qualification or relegation
1	Södertälje Kings	26	8	.765	34	Qualified for quarterfinals
2	Borås	25	9	.735	34	Qualified for quarterfinals
3	Norrköping Dolphins	25	9	.735	34	Qualified for quarterfinals
4	LF	25	9	.735	34	Qualified for quarterfinals
5	Sundsvall Dragons	21	13	.618	34	Qualified for quarterfinals
6	Uppsala	21	13	.618	34	Qualified for quarterfinals
7	Solna Vikings	15	19	.441	34	Qualified for quarterfinals
8	KFUM Nässjö	10	24	.294	34	Qualified for quarterfinals
9	Umeå	8	26	.235	34	
10	Jämtland	7	27	.206	34	
11	Eco Örebro	6	28	.176	34	

== Playoffs ==
Different from last year, the semi-finals were played in a best-of-seven format.

Quarter-finals
1	Södertälje Kings	3
8	KFUM Nässjö	0
4	LF	0
5	Sundsvall Dragons	3
2	Borås	3
7	Solna Vikings	1
3	Norrköping Dolphins	2
6	Uppsala	3

Semi-finals
1	Södertälje Kings	4
5	Sundsvall Dragons	1
2	Borås	2
6	Uppsala	4

Finals
1	Södertälje Kings	4
6	Uppsala	1

== Awards ==
Award	Player
MVP	(United States) John Roberson
Finals MVP	(United States) John Roberson
Guard of the Year	(United States) John Roberson
Forward of the Year	(Sweden) Christian Maråker
Center of the Year	(Sweden) Joakim Kjellbom
Coach of the Year	(Sweden) Lars Johansson
Rookie of the Year	(Sweden) Johan Löfberg
Best Defender	(United States) Alex Wesby
