= Hlynur Bæringsson =

Icelandic basketball player

Hlynur Elías Bæringsson
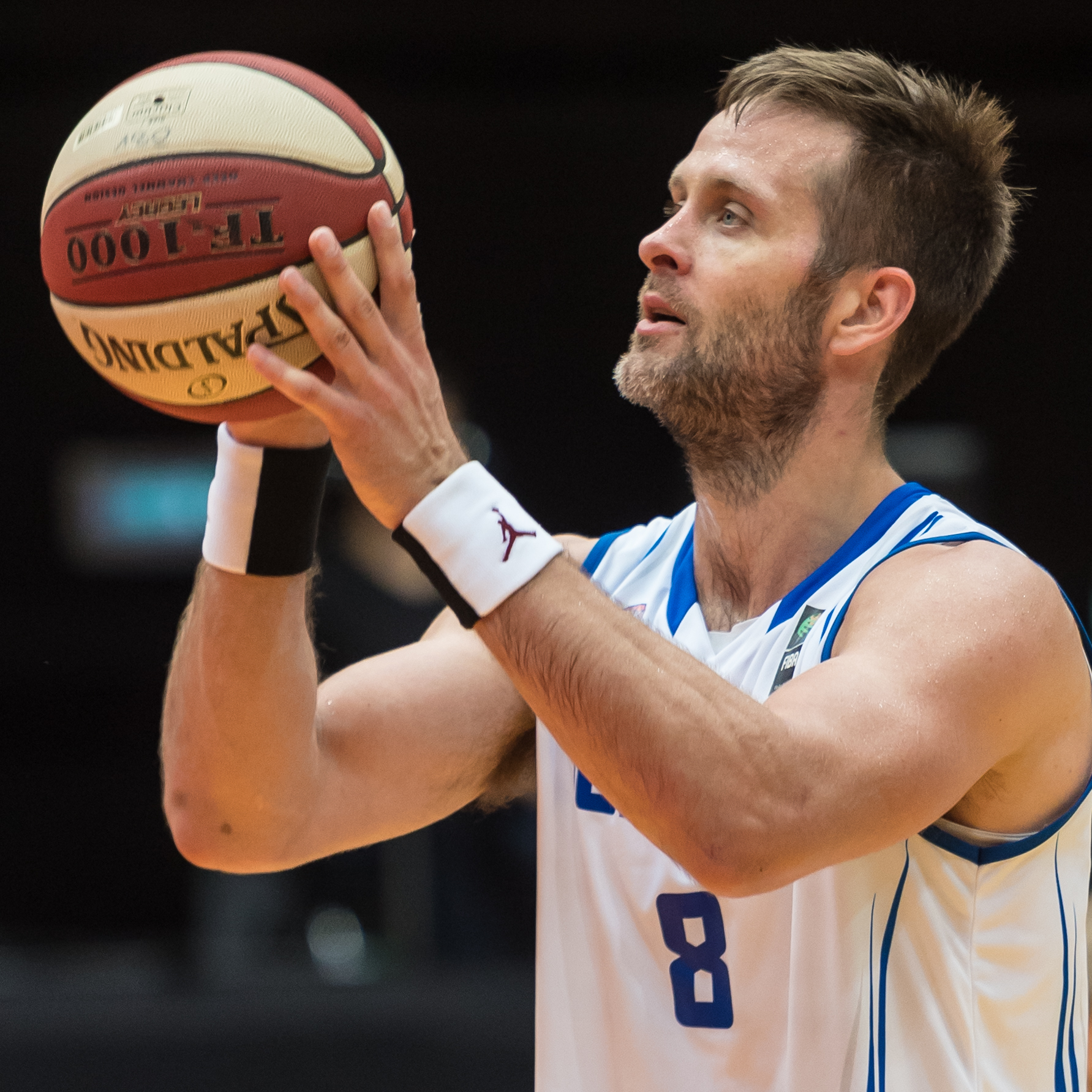

Personal information
- Born: 6 July 1982 (age 44) Stykkishólmur, Iceland
- Listed height: 6 ft 7 in (2.01 m)
- Listed weight: 220 lb (100 kg)

Career information
- Playing career: 1997–2025
- Position: Power forward

Career history

Playing
- 1997–2002: Skallagrímur
- 2002–2005: Snæfell
- 2005–2006: Aris Leeuwarden
- 2006–2010: Snæfell
- 2010–2016: Sundsvall Dragons
- 2016–2025: Stjarnan

Coaching
- 2008–2009: Snæfell
- 2021: Stjarnan (assistant)

Career highlights
- 2x Icelandic League champion (2010, 2025); Swedish League champion (2011); 5× Icelandic Basketball Cup (2008, 2010, 2019, 2020, 2022); Úrvalsdeild Playoffs MVP (2010); 2× Úrvalsdeild Domestic Player of the Year (2008, 2010); 9× Úrvalsdeild Domestic All-First Team (2002–2004, 2007, 2008, 2010, 2017–2019); 3× Úrvalsdeild Defense Player of the Year (2008, 2010, 2017); 2× Basketligan Best Defender (2013, 2014); Úrvalsdeild all-time career rebounding leader; 3× Basketligan rebounding leader (2011, 2013, 2016)
Medals
Men's basketball
Representing Iceland
Games of the Small States of Europe
Silver medal – second place	2015 Reykjavík	Team

Hlynur Elías Bæringsson (born 6 July 1982) is an Icelandic former basketball player. During his career, he won the Icelandic championship twice, in 2010 as a member of Snæfell and in 2025 with Stjarnan. In 2011 he won the Swedish championship as a member of Sundsvall Dragons.

Hlynur was a key player with the Icelandic national team when it made its first appearance in EuroBasket in 2015 and again in 2017. He is one of eight players who have played at least 120 games for the team.

A prolific rebounder, he led the Úrvalsdeild karla in rebounds twice and the Basketligan once. In 2019, he became the Úrvalsdeild karla all-time career rebounding leader.

== Basketball career ==
=== Club career ===
Hlynur started his career with Skallagrímur in the Icelandic Úrvalsdeild in 1997 but moved to Snæfell in 2002. He spent the next three seasons there, losing to Keflavík in the national finals in 2004 and 2005.

In 2005 Hlynur joined Woon! Aris Leeuwarden of the Dutch Eredivisie. For the season he averaged 11.8 ppg and 11.0 rpg and appeared in the Dutch all-star game. He rejoined Snæfell after the season and spent the next four seasons there. Snæfell once again lost to Keflavík in the 2008 finals before finally beating them in 2010 and winning the first Icelandic championship in the history of the club.

From 2010 to 2016, Hlynur played in the Swedish Basketligan for Sundsvall. In 2011 he won the Swedish championship and in 2013 and 2014 he was named the Basketligan's best defender.

In August 2016 Hlynur signed with Stjarnan of the Icelandic Úrvalsdeild.

On 23 March 2018 Hlynur was fouled hard by Ryan Taylor in game three of Stjarnan's first round series against ÍR. After the game he experienced concussion like symptoms and was ultimately ruled out of game four which Stjarnan eventually lost. Although Taylor received an unsportsmanlike foul, he was not ejected from the game. After the game he received a three-game suspension from the league.

On 20 April 2018 Hlynur signed a two-year contract extension with Stjarnan.

On 4 May 2018 Hlynur was named to the Úrvalsdeild Karla Domestic All-First Team.

On 17 February 2019, Hlynur had 13 points and 14 rebounds in Stjarnan's 84–68 victory against Njarðvík in the Icelandic Cup finals. In May 2019, Hlynur was named to the Úrvalsdeild Domestic All-First Team. On 4 March 2019, Hlynur became the Úrvalsdeild all-time career assists leader, surpassing Guðmundur Bragason.

Stjarnan opened the 2019–20 season with a 89–77 win against reigning champions KR in the annual Icelandic Super Cup where Hlynur posted 12 points and 7 rebounds. On 5 January 2020, he appeared in an Úrvalsdeild game for the fourth different decade. On 15 February 2020, Hlynur won the Icelandic Cup for the fourth time after Stjarnan's 75–89 win against Grindavík in the Cup final.

On 19 March 2022, he won his fifth Icelandic Basketball Cup when Stjarnan defeated reigning national champions Þór Þorlákshöfn in the 2022 Cup Finals.

On 21 May 2025, he won the Icelandic championship for the second time in his career. Following the title clinching game, he announced his retirement from basketball.

=== National team career ===
Hlynur was a part of the first Icelandic national basketball team to qualify for a EuroBasket tournament, in 2015. He also played at EuroBasket 2015 with Iceland, where he averaged 10.8 points and 7 rebounds per game.

On 7 September 2016 Hlynur became the thirteenth player to play 100 games for the national team.

Hlynur participated with Iceland at EuroBasket 2017.

In February 2019, Hlynur announced that the Iceland's upcoming game against Portugal on 21 February 2019 would be his last for the national team. He retired after Iceland's 91–67 victory, where he led all players with 12 rebounds along with his 7 points. In July 2019, Hlynur agreed to return to the team for its games against Portugal and Switzerland in the EuroBasket 2021 qualification due to injuries in the squad.

In February 2023, Hlynur once again returned to the national team ahead of its games against Spain and Georgia. On 23 February against Spain, he became the oldest player to play for the national team, breaking Alexander Ermolinskij's record from 1997, and the first one to play for it after turning 40 years old.

== Honours ==
=== Iceland ===
==== Club ====
- Icelandic Champion: 2010
- Icelandic Basketball Cup: 2008, 2010, 2019, 2020, 2022
- Icelandic Super Cup: 2019, 2020
- Icelandic Company Cup: 2004, 2007

==== Individual ====
- Úrvalsdeild Domestic Player of the Year: 2008, 2010
- Úrvalsdeild Playoffs MVP: 2010
- Úrvalsdeild Defense Player of the Year: 2008, 2010, 2017
- Úrvalsdeild Young Player of the Year: 1999
- Úrvalsdeild Domestic All-First Team: 2002–2004, 2007, 2008, 2010, 2017, 2018, 2019
- Úrvalsdeild karla rebounding leader: 2009, 2010

=== Netherlands ===
==== Individual ====
- Dutch All-Star game: 2006

=== Sweden ===
==== Club ====
- Swedish Champion: 2011

==== Individual ====
- Defense Player of the Year: 2013, 2014
- Basketligan rebounding leader: 2011, 2013, 2016
