= Stockholm Eagles =

- Founded: December 2007
- Arena: Brännkyrkahallen
- Location: Stockholm, Sweden

The Stockholm Eagles is a basketball club in Stockholm, Sweden. The club was established in December 2007. In 2012 the club qualified for the Swedish men's top division. After the 2012-2013 season, the club was kicked out of the Swedish top division after failing to live up to the economic demands.
