= 2013–14 Basketligan season =

Basketligan
- Season: 2013–14
- Duration: 2 October 2013 – 10 May 2014
- Games played: 36 (regular season)
- Teams: 10

Regular season
- Top seed: Södertälje Kings
- Season MVP: (Croatia) Toni Bizaca

Finals
- Champions: Södertälje Kings (9th title)
- Runners-up: Norrköping Dolphins
- Finals MVP: (Croatia) Toni Bizaca

Awards
- Rookie of the Year: (Sweden) Mikael Axelsson
- Defender of the Year: (Iceland) Hlynur Bæringsson
- Guard of the Year: (United States) James Miller
- Forward of the Year: (Croatia) Toni Bizaca
- Center of the Year: (Sweden) Joakim Kjellbom

Statistical leaders
Points	(United States) James Miller	23.4
Rebounds	(United States) Brandon Peterson	11.1
Assists	(Sweden) Mats Levin	6.7

The 2013–14 Basketligan season was the 21st season of the Basketligan, the highest professional basketball league in Sweden. Södertälje Kings successfully defended their title by winning the Finals 4–3 over Norrköping Dolphins.

== Regular season ==
Qualified for Playoffs

Pos	Team	GP	W	L	PF	PA	PD	Pnt^{1}
1.	Södertälje Kings	36	32	4	3123	2638	+485	64
2.	Borås Basket	36	27	9	3159	2930	+229	54
3.	Norrköping Dolphins	36	23	13	2944	2732	+212	46
4.	Sundsvall Dragons	36	22	14	3028	2875	+153	44
5.	Uppsala Basket	36	21	15	2984	2822	+162	42
6.	Solna Vikings	36	16	20	2865	2969	–104	32
7.	LF Basket	36	13	23	2968	3151	–183	26
8.	Jämtland Basket	36	12	24	2842	3159	–317	22
9.	KFUM Nässjö	36	8	28	2929	3149	–220	16
10.	Eco Örebro	36	6	30	2760	3177	–417	12

^{1} Teams were awarded 2 points for a win and 0 for a loss.

== Playoffs ==
Different from last year, the semi-finals were played in a best-of-seven format.

Quarter-finals
1	Södertälje Kings	3
8	Jämtland Basket	1
4	Sundsvall Dragons	1
5	Uppsala Basket	3
2	Borås Basket	3
7	LF Basket	2
3	Norrköping Dolphins	3
6	Solna Vikings	0

Semi-finals
1	Södertälje Kings	4
5	Uppsala Basket	3
2	Borås Basket	2
3	Norrköping Dolphins	4

Finals
1	Södertälje Kings	4
3	Norrköping Dolphins	3
