= Christian Maråker =

Swedish basketball player (born 1982)

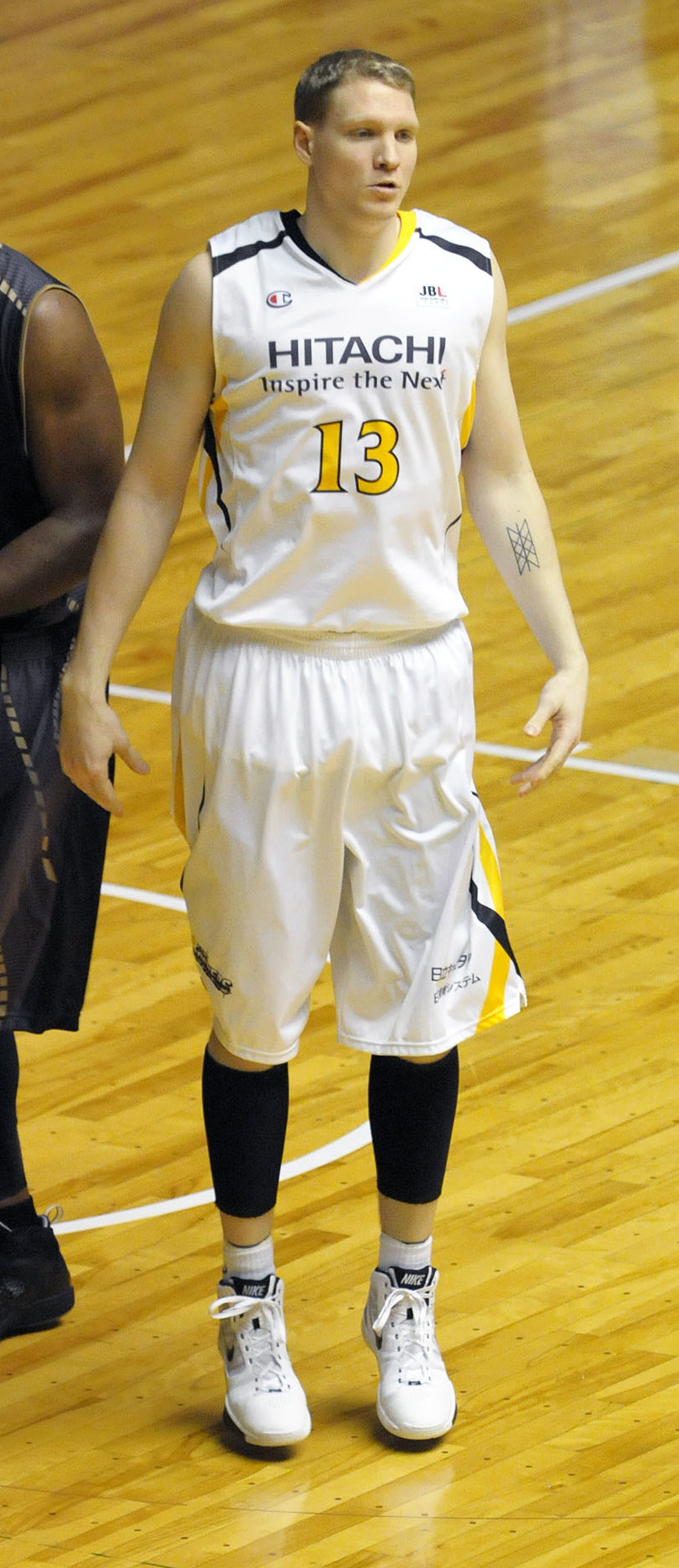
- Maråker at Akita Prefectural Gymnasium in 2012

No. 12 – Borås
- Position: Power forward / center
- League: Basketligan

Personal information
- Born: 24 September 1982 (age 44) Varberg, Sweden
- Listed height: 6 ft 9 in (2.06 m)
- Listed weight: 225 lb (102 kg)

Career information
- College: Pacific (2001–2006)
- NBA draft: 2006: undrafted
- Playing career: 1999–present

Career history
- 1999–2000: Sanda Wolves
- 2000–2001: Södertälje Kings
- 2006–2007: Olimpija
- 2006–2007: Zaragoza
- 2007–2008: Lleida
- 2008–2009: Tenerife
- 2009–2011: Rera Kamuy Hokkaido
- 2012–2013: Norrköping Dolphins
- 2014–2016: Borås

Career highlights
- Big West Player of the Year (2006)

Christian Erik Maråker (born 24 September 1982) is a Swedish basketball player who finished his playing career with Borås Basket of the Basketligan in 2016. A 6'9" center/power forward, he played college basketball in the United States at the University of the Pacific from 2002 to 2006.

== Career ==
Maråker attended Sanda Gymnasium in Huskvarna, Sweden. After his second season at Sanda, he moved to the Sodertalje Club Team. He earned all-star honors at both the Under 20 Swedish Championships in 2001 and the Junior Swedish Championships in 2000. He also earned Stadium Cup Most Valuable Player honors in 2001. At the 2001 Stockholm Club Tournament, Maråker scored 26 points in the championship game against the Solna Club team from Stockholm. He played for two years with the Swedish Under 20 National Team.

At Pacific he averaged 17.6 points, 8.9 rebounds and 2.2 assists per game. He was the 2005-2006 Big West Conference Player of the Year, and was only the sixth player to be named first-team All-Big West three times in his career.

He was listed as a sleeper pick in the 2006 NBA draft. Some experts thought he might get picked up by the Utah Jazz, but went undrafted.

Shortly after the 2006 NBA draft, Maråker was invited as an undrafted free agent to play for the Sacramento Kings team in the NBA Summer League in Las Vegas, Nevada. He ended up playing in seven games over two seasons for the Kings in the NBA Summer League, scoring a total of 27 points.

On 16 August 2006, Maråker signed to play in the EuroLeague with Union Olimpija.

== Honours ==
Pacific Tigers

- Big West Conference Champion
  - 2004, 2006
- All-Big West Player of the Year
  - 2006
- Big West All-Tournament Team
  - 2006
