= Rudy Mbemba =

Swedish basketball player

Rudy Mbemba (born August 29, 1987 in Spånga, Sweden) is a Swedish professional basketball player. He is 1.83 m (6 ft) tall and 88 kg (195 pounds) in weight. He plays at the point guard position. He currently plays for Umeå BSKT Umeå.

== Professional career ==
In his pro career he has played with KFUM Söder, 08 Stockholm Human Rights and the Solna Vikings of the Swedish Basketball League, UB La Palma of the Spanish Second League, the Frankfurt Skyliners of the German Basketball League, Vanoli Gruppo Triboldi Soresina of the Italian Second League, and AEL 1964 GS of the HEBA A1 League.

== Doping ban ==
In June 2014 Mbemba was handed a two-year doping sanction after several whereabouts failures. The ban ended 1 June 2016.
