= Toni Bizaca =

Croatian professional basketball player

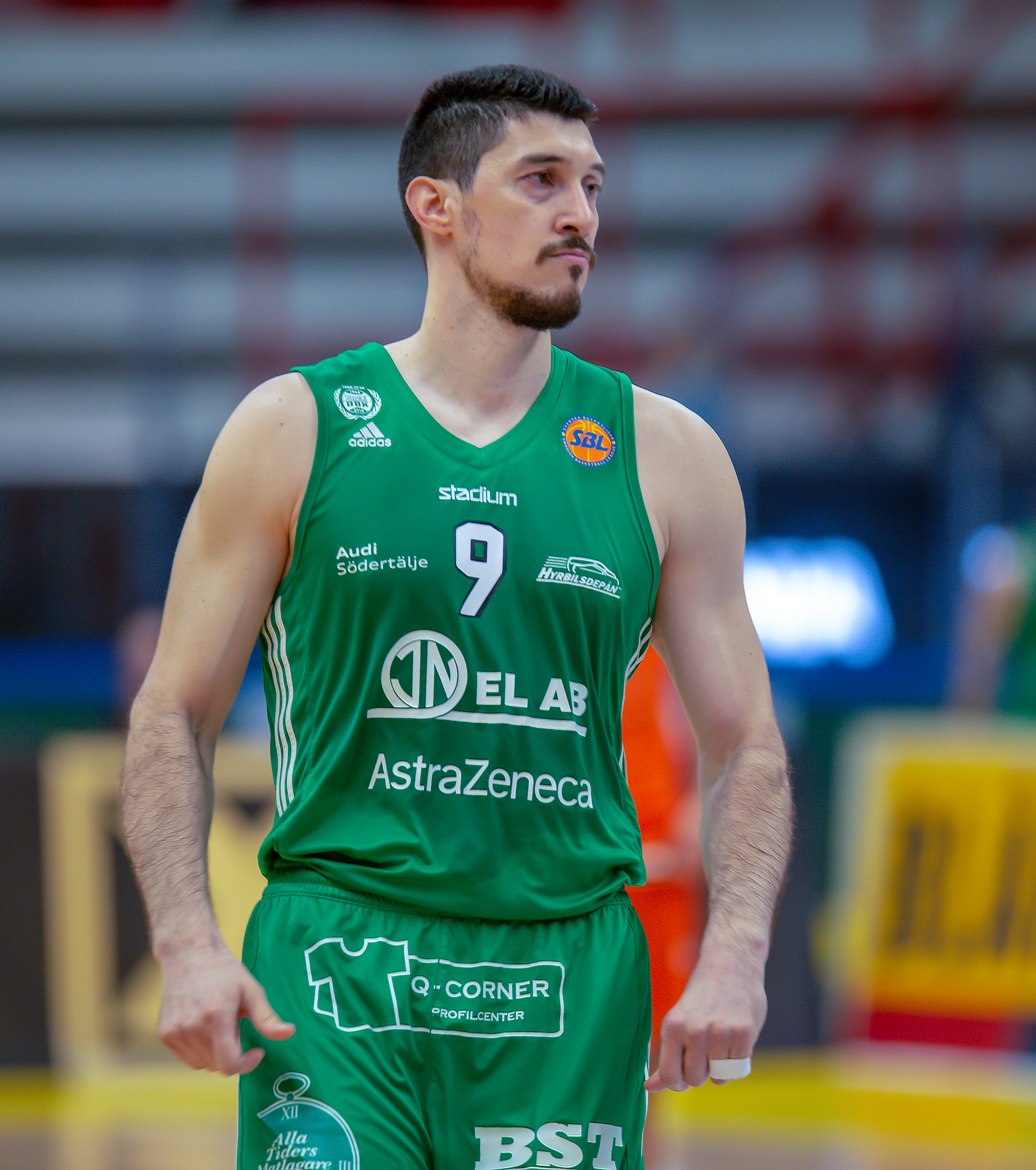
- Bizaca playing for Södertälje in 2019

Personal information
- Born: 3 December 1982 (age 43) Split, Croatia
- Listed height: 6 ft 8 in (2.03 m)
- Listed weight: 220 lb (100 kg)

Career information
- NBA draft: 2004: undrafted
- Playing career: 2001–2019
- Position: Power forward / small forward
- Number: 5, 38

Career history
- 2001–2002: Plastik Solin
- 2002–2003: Split
- 2003–2004: Troglav Livno
- 2004–2005: Trogir ZP
- 2005–2007: HKK Grude
- 2007–2010: Trogir ZP
- 2010–2011: Khimik
- 2011–2012: Dubrovnik
- 2012–2019: Södertälje Kings

Career highlights
- 2× Basketligan MVP (2013, 2014); Basketligan Finals MVP (2014); 5× Basketligan champion (2013–2016, 2019); A-1 Liga All-Star (2010)

Toni Bizaca (born 3 December 1982) is a Croatian retired basketball player. Bizaca is a 6 ft 8 in forward and has played for multiple teams in Bosnia and Herzegovina, Croatia, Ukraine and Sweden in his career. In Sweden, he won five Basketligan championships and was named the league's Most Valuable Player twice.

== Career statistics ==
Legend
GP	Games played	MPG	Minutes per game	FG%	Field goal percentage
3P%	3-point field goal percentage	FT%	Free throw percentage	RPG	Rebounds per game
APG	Assists per game	SPG	Steals per game	BPG	Blocks per game
PPG	Points per game	**Bold**	Career high		Led the league

†	Denotes seasons in which Bizaca's team won the league

=== Domestic ===
Year	Team	League	GP	MPG	FG%	3P%	FT%	RPG	APG	SPG	BPG	PPG	
2011-12	Dubrovnik	A-1 Liga	9		**35.4**	**.611**	**.474**	.818	**6.9**	1.6	.9	**1.3**	**23.7**
2012-13†	Södertälje	Basketligan	41		25.2	.485	.367	.821	4.3	1.3	.8	.4	15.6
2013-14†	Södertälje	Basketligan	52		27.5	.487	.454	.814	4.3	1.7	.7	.7	17.2
2014-15†	Södertälje	Basketligan	47		28.5	.454	.387	.831	4.5	**1.7**	.7	.4	16.7
2015-16†	Södertälje	Basketligan	40		27.2	.500	.395	**.832**	4.5	1.5	**1.1**	.5	16.8

== Honours ==
Södertälje Kings

- Basketligan (5): 2013, 2014, 2015, 2016, 2019

Individual awards

- Basketligan MVP (2): 2013, 2014
- Basketligan Finals MVP: 2014
- A-1 Liga All-Star: 2010
