= 2017–18 Basketligan season =

Basketligan
- Season: 2017–18
- Duration: 6 October 2017 – May 2018
- Teams: 8

Finals
- Champions: Norrköping Dolphins (5th title)
- Runners-up: Luleå

The 2017–18 Basketligan season was the 25th season of the Basketligan, the top tier basketball league on Sweden. The season started on 6 October 2017 and finished in May 2018. Luleå was the defending champion, but failed to repeat as they lost in the last game of the finals to Norrköping Dolphins, that achieved their fifth title ever.

== Competition format ==
The participating teams first played a conventional round-robin schedule with every team playing each opponent four times for a total of 28 games. The top six teams qualified for the championship playoffs.

== Teams ==
Location of teams in the Basketligan 2017–18

After the end of the 2016–17 season, Malbas decided to not continue playing at Basketligan.

Team	City	Venue	Capacity
BC Luleå	Luleå	Luleå Energi Arena	2,700
Borås Basket	Borås	Boråshallen	3,000
Jämtland Basket	Östersund	Östersunds sporthall	1,700
Norrköping Dolphins	Norrköping	Stadium Arena	4,500
KFUM Nässjö	Nässjö	Nässjö Sporthall	Unknown
Södertälje Kings	Södertälje	Täljehallen	2,200
Umeå BSKT	Umeå	Umeå Energi Arena	1,270
Uppsala Basket	Uppsala	IFU Arena	2,880

== Regular season ==
=== Standings ===
Pos	Team	Pld	W	L	PF	PA	PD	Pts	Qualification
1	Luleå	28	22	6	2457	2202	+255	44	Qualification to semifinals
2	Norrköping Dolphins	28	21	7	2292	2102	+190	42	Qualification to semifinals
3	Jämtland	28	15	13	2284	2214	+70	30	Qualification to quarterfinals
4	Södertälje Kings	28	15	13	2195	2159	+36	30	Qualification to quarterfinals
5	Umeå BSKT	28	13	15	2372	2456	−84	26	Qualification to quarterfinals
6	Borås	28	13	15	2203	2251	−48	26	Qualification to quarterfinals
7	Uppsala	28	8	20	2178	2302	−124	16	
8	KFUM Nässjö	28	5	23	2139	2434	−295	10	

Source: Basketligan
Rules for classification: 1) Points; 2) Head-to-head results; 3) Head-to-head points ratio; 4) Total points ratio.

== Playoffs ==
=== Bracket ===
Quarterfinals
4 Södertälje Kings	2
5 Umeå BSKT	0
3 Jämtland	1
6 Borås	2

Semifinals
1 Luleå	4
4 Södertälje Kings	2
2 Norrköping Dolphins	4
6 Borås	1

Finals
1 Luleå	3
2 Norrköping Dolphins	4

=== Quarterfinals ===
Team 1	Series	Team 2	Game 1	Game 2	Game 3
Södertälje Kings	2–0	Umeå BSKT	81–78	76–73	
Jämtland	1–2	Borås	69–92	85–73	83–86

=== Semifinals ===
Seeded teams played legs 1, 3, 5 and 7 at home.

Team 1	Series	Team 2	Game 1	Game 2	Game 3	Game 4	Game 5	Game 6	Game 7
Luleå	4–2	Södertälje Kings	83–62	69–89	82–78	89–91	86–85	91–84	
Norrköping Dolphins	4–1	Borås	85–80	102–100	85–89	81–69	70–56		

=== Finals ===
Seeded team played legs 1, 3, 5 and 7 at home.

Team 1	Series	Team 2	Game 1	Game 2	Game 3	Game 4	Game 5	Game 6	Game 7
Luleå	3–4	Norrköping Dolphins	77–59	75–86	88–54	65–80	82–74	90–95	71–76

== Clubs in European competitions ==
Team	Competition	Progress	Ref
Luleå	Champions League	First qualifying round	
Borås	FIBA Europe Cup	First qualifying round	
Södertälje Kings	FIBA Europe Cup	Second qualifying round	
