= Olle Håkansson =

Swedish footballer

Personal information
- Date of birth: 22 February 1927
- Place of birth: Sweden
- Date of death: 11 February 2001 (aged 73)
- Position: Midfielder

Senior career*
Years	Team	Apps	(Gls)
- IFK Norrköping

International career
1951–1957	Sweden B	5	(0)
1956–1958	Sweden	7	(0)
Medal record
Men's Football
Representing Sweden
FIFA World Cup
Runner-up	1958 Sweden
- * Club domestic league appearances and goals

Olle Håkansson (22 February 1927 – 11 February 2001) was a Swedish footballer who played as a midfielder who played club football for IFK Norrköping. He represented Team Sweden at the 1958 FIFA World Cup in Sweden, and played a total number of seven international games.
