= Eco Örebro =

- Leagues: Basketligan
- Founded: 2009
- Dissolved: 2016
- History: Eco Örebro; 2009–2016
- Arena: Idrottshuset
- Capacity: 2,100
- Location: Örebro, Sweden
- Team colors: Green, White
- Website: ecoorebrobasket.se
Home

Eco Örebro was a Swedish professional basketball club in Örebro. They played in the Basketligan, the highest tier in Sweden, from the 2009–10 season.

On 12 May 2016 it was announced that the club was kicked out of Basketligan and the club then decided to give up its activities for some financial reasons.

== Season by season ==
Season	Tier	League	Pos.
2010–11	1	Basketligan	10th
2011–12	1	Basketligan	10th
2012–13	1	Basketligan	12th
2013–14	1	Basketligan	10th
2014–15	1	Basketligan	11th
2015–16	1	Basketligan	10th

== Roster ==
Eco Örebro roster
Players
Coaches

Pos.	No.	Nat.	Name	Ht.
PG	4	(United States)	Mosley, Leonard	1.96 m (6 ft 5 in)
PF	5	(Sweden)	Andersson, Sebastian	1.98 m (6 ft 6 in)
SF	6	(Sweden)	Karlsson, Andreas	1.98 m (6 ft 6 in)
PG	7	(Sweden)	Pleick, Andrew	1.94 m (6 ft 4 in)
PF	8	(Sweden)	Andersson, Jesper	2.03 m (6 ft 8 in)
SG	9	(Sweden)	Ibragim, Salar	1.83 m (6 ft 0 in)
C	10	(United States)	Cipriano, Pedro	2.06 m (6 ft 9 in)
SF	11	(Sweden)	Saleman, Egal	2.01 m (6 ft 7 in)
PG	12	(Sweden)	Smith, Sean	1.98 m (6 ft 6 in)
SG	13	(Sweden)	Lindskog, Nicklas	1.88 m (6 ft 2 in)
C	14	(Sweden)	Lindell, Odin	2.05 m (6 ft 9 in)
PG	15	(Sweden)	Hampton, Pierre	2.00 m (6 ft 7 in)

Head coach

- (Sweden) Lennart Grundel

Legend

- (C) Team captain
- Injured
