= Fred Drains =

American-Swedish basketball player

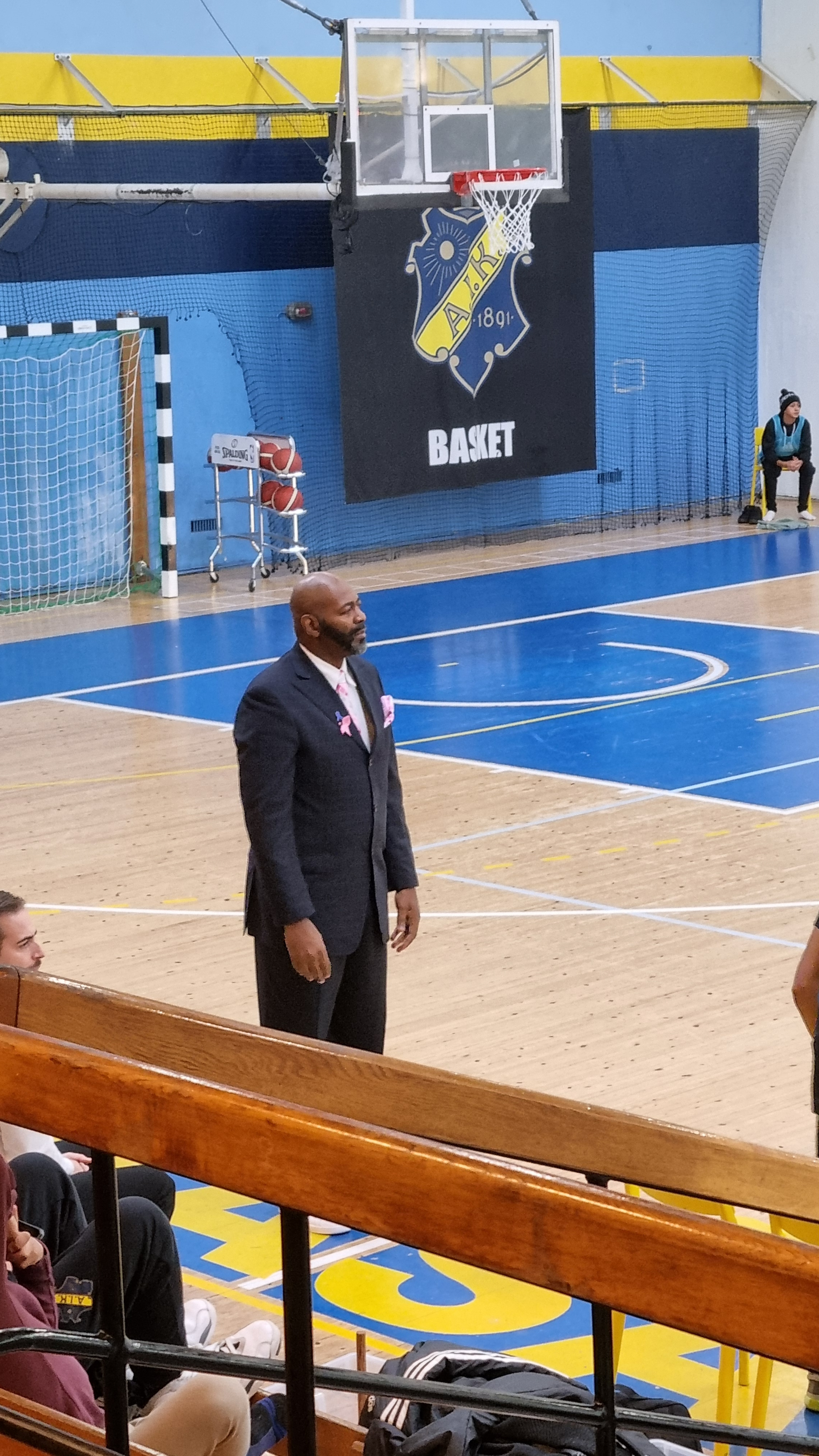

Personal information
- Born: January 10, 1971 (age 55) Salem, New Jersey
- Listed height: 1.96 m (6 ft 5 in)

Career information
- High school: Woodstown (Woodstown, New Jersey)
- College: Kean College
- NBA draft: 1993: undrafted
- Playing career: 1993–2014
- Position: Power forward
- Number: Fred Drains.jpg in 2024
- Coaching career: 2022–present

Career history

Playing
- 2000–2003: Norrköping Dolphins
- 2004–2007: Plannja Basket
- 2008–2013: Norrköping Dolphins
- 2013–2014: Alvik Basket

Coaching
- 2019: Alvik
- 2022-present: AIK

Career highlights
- 4x Swedish League MVP (2001, 2002, 2005, 2007)

Fred Drains (born January 10, 1971) is an American-Swedish former professional basketball player. Drains played the majority of his career in Sweden, where was named Basketligan MVP four times.

== College career ==
Drains attended Woodstown High School in Woodstown, New Jersey, before playing for Kean College (now Kean University), where he was selected to New Jersey Athletic Conference all-conference basketball first team and recognized as player of the year as a junior in the 1991–1992 season.

== Professional career ==
In 1993 he was in the NBA Draft, but failed to be drafted. Moving to Sweden and being naturalized, he played power forward for the Norrköping Dolphins and later on for Plannja Basket, both in the Basketligan, the premier league for professional basketball in Sweden.

He was picked as Basketligan MVP four times making him the most decorated basketball player winning the Swedish League MVP Awards: He was Sweden' basketball MVP for seasons 2000–01 and 2001–02 while in the Norrköping Dolphins and in seasons 2004–05 and 2006–07 while playing for Plannja Basket.

== Coaching career ==
On the 3rd of April, 2022, Drains was hired as head Coach for AIK Basket in Superettan.

== See also ==
- Basketligan MVP
