= 2012–13 Basketligan season =

Basketligan
- Duration: October 4, 2012 – April 30, 2013
- Games played: 33 (regular season)
- Teams: 12

Regular season
- Top seed: Sundsvall Dragons
- Season MVP: (Croatia) Toni Bizaca

Finals
- Champions: Södertälje Kings; 8th title
- Runners-up: Sundsvall Dragons
- Finals MVP: (United States) John Roberson

Statistical leaders
Points	(United States) James Miller	22.2
Rebounds	(Iceland) Hlynur Bæringsson	10.3
Assists	(United States) James Miller	6.1

The 2012–13 Basketligan season was the 20th season of the Basketligan. Twelve teams participated and Södertälje Kings eventually won the Swedish championship.

== Regular season ==
Qualification for Playoffs

Pos.	Club	GP	W	L	PF	PA	PD	Points^{1}
1	Sundsvall Dragons	33	27	6	3003	2703	300	54
2	Uppsala Basket	33	25	8	2762	2438	324	50
3	Södertälje Kings	33	24	9	2734	2434	300	48
4	Norrköping Dolphins	33	21	12	2714	2577	137	42
5	Borås Basket	33	21	12	3141	3030	131	42
6	Solna Vikings	33	20	13	2770	2652	48	40
7	LF Basket	33	17	16	2830	2755	75	34
8	08 Stockholm Human Rights	33	16	17	2769	2762	7	32
9	Jämtland Basket	33	8	25	2506	2824	–318	16
10	Stockholm Eagles	33	7	26	2513	2778	–265	14
11	KFUM Nässjö	33	7	26	2433	2803	–370	14
12	Eco Örebro	33	5	28	2497	2916	–419	10

^{1}Teams were awarded 2 points for a win, 0 for a loss.

== Playoffs ==
Quarterfinals
1	Sundsvall Dragons	3
8	08 Stockholm Human Rights	1
4	Norrköping Dolphins	3
5	Borås Basket	1
2	Uppsala Basket	3
7	LF Basket	1
3	Södertälje Kings	3
6	Solna Vikings	2

Semifinals
1	Sundsvall Dragons	3
4	Norrköping Dolphins	1
2	Uppsala Basket	0
3	Södertälje Kings	3

Finals
1	Sundsvall Dragons	2
3	Södertälje Kings	4

== Awards ==
- Most Valuable Player: (Croatia) Toni Bizaca (Södertälje Kings)
- Finals MVP: (United States) John Roberson (Södertälje Kings)
- Rookie of the Year: (Sweden) Mathias Liljeqvist (KFUM Nässjö)
- Defender of the Year: (Iceland) Hlynur Baeringsson (Sundsvall Dragons)
- Guard of the Year: (United States) James Miller (Borås Basket)
- Forward of the Year: (United States) Kodi Augustus (08 Stockholm Human Rights)
- Center of the Year: (United States) Keith Wright (Uppsala Basket)
