= Joakim Kjellbom =

Swedish basketball player

Personal information
- Born: April 22, 1979 (age 47) Paragould, Arkansas
- Listed height: 2.13 m (7 ft 0 in)
- Listed weight: 225 lb (102 kg)

Career information
- College: Irvine Valley College (2001–2003); Northern Arizona (2003–2004)
- Playing career: 2004–present
- Position: Center
- Number: 6

Career history
- 2004–2006: Sundsvall Dragons
- 2006: Castelletto Ticino
- 2006–2008: Sundsvall Dragons
- 2008–2011: Norrköping Dolphins
- 2011–2012: Armia
- 2012–2019: Norrköping Dolphins

Career highlights
- 3x Swedish League MVP (2008, 2010, 2016); 2× Swedish League champion (2010, 2018)

Joakim Kjellbom (born April 22, 1979) is an American-born Swedish former professional basketball player. Kjellbom plays as center. He is one of the most successful basketball players in the history of Swedish basketball, as he has won three Swedish League MVP Awards.

== Professional career ==
Kjellbom won his first MVP title in 2007–08 season while playing for Sundsvall Dragons. He won the title a second time in 2009–10 season while playing for the Norrköping Dolphins. His third and last MVP award was in the 2015–16 season, when he was 37 years old and playing for also for the Norrköping Dolphins. This makes him the second most decorated MVP player in Swedish basketball. Fred Drains won the title four times.
