= Alex Wesby =

American basketball player (born 1980)

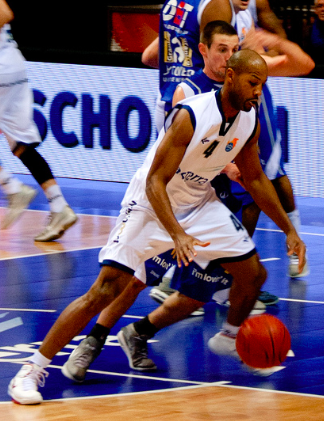
- Wesby for GasTerra Flames in 2011

Personal information
- Born: July 5, 1980 (age 46) Philadelphia, Pennsylvania
- Listed height: 6 ft 6 in (1.98 m)
- Listed weight: 220 lb (100 kg)

Career information
- High school: Benjamin Franklin (Philadelphia, Pennsylvania)
- College: Temple (1999–2003)
- NBA draft: 2003: undrafted
- Playing career: 2003–2018
- Position: Shooting guard
- Number: 9

Career history
- 2003: Saint-Étienne Basket
- 2003–2004: Swans Gmunden
- 2004–2005: Sundsvall Dragons
- 2005–2006: Kataja
- 2006–2007: Torpan Pojat
- 2007–2009: Sundsvall Dragons
- 2009–2010: ETHA Engomis
- 2010–2011: Sundsvall Dragons
- 2011–2012: GasTerra Flames
- 2012–2013: Sundsvall Dragons
- 2013–2014: Kataja
- 2014–2016: LF Basket Norrbotten
- 2016–2018: Swans Gmunden

Career highlights
- Basketligan Most Valuable Player (2011)

Alex Wesby (born July 5, 1980) is an American retired basketball player from Philadelphia. He played for Temple in college and played as a professional player in multiple countries in Europe.

== Career ==
In the 2010–11 season, Wesby played in Sweden for Sundsvall Dragons. He won the Most Valuable Player award of the Swedish League, as well as the award for the Best Defender.

Wesby signed with GasTerra Flames from Groningen, Netherlands for the 2011–12 season. He reached the semifinals with Groningen and was named to the All-DBL Team.

He returned to the Sundsvall Dragons for his fourth stand with the club for the 2012–13 season. He signed till 2015. He started the 2013–14 season in Sweden, but left the club in December 2013 because of personal reasons.

In the 2014 offseason he signed with another Swedish team, LF Basket Norrbotten.

== Honours ==
=== Club ===
Joensuun Kataja

- Korisliiga finalist (2): 2005–06, 2013–14
- Finnish cup runner-up (1): 2005–06

Steiner Swans Gmunden

- Austrian Basketball Cup (1): 2003–04

Sundsvall Dragons

- Ligan (2): 2008–09, 2010–11

=== Individual ===
- Basketligan MVP (1): 2010–11
- Ligan Best Defender (1): 2010–11
- Ligan All-Star (2): 2008, 2011
- All-DBL Team (1): 2011–12
