= 2015–16 Basketligan season =

Basketligan
- Season: 2015–16
- Teams: 11

Regular season
- Top seed: Södertälje Kings
- Season MVP: (Sweden) Joakim Kjellbom

Finals
- Champions: Södertälje Kings (11th title)
- Runners-up: Norrköping Dolphins
- Finals MVP: (United States) Skyler Bowlin

Statistical leaders
Points	(United States) Corin Henry	21.2
Rebounds	(Iceland) Hlynur Bæringsson	10.0
Assists	(Croatia) Toni Prostran	7.7

The 2015–16 Basketligan season was the 23rd season of the Basketligan, the top tier basketball league on Sweden. The season started on 15 October 2015 and ended on 28 April 2016. Södertälje Kings was the defending champion, and successfully reclaimed its title. In the Finals, Södertalje had a clean sweep over Norrköping 4–0 to capture its 11th title.

== Competition format ==
The participating teams first play a conventional round-robin schedule with every team playing each opponent three times for a total of 30 games. The top eight teams qualified for the championship playoffs.

== Current teams ==
Location of teams in the Basketligan 2015–16

Team	City	Venue	Capacity
BC Luleå	Luleå	ARCUS Arena	1,700
Borås Basket	Borås	Boråshallen	3,000
Eco Örebro	Örebro	Idrottshuset	2,100
Jämtland Basket	Östersund	Östersunds sporthall	1,250
Malbas	Malmö	Heleneholms Sporthall	
Norrköping Dolphins	Norrköping	Stadium Arena	4,500
KFUM Nässjö	Nässjö		
Sundsvall Dragons	Sundsvall	Sporthallen Sundsvall	2,300
Södertälje Kings	Södertälje	Täljehallen	2,200
Umeå BSKT	Umeå	Umeå Energi Arena	1,270
Uppsala Basket	Uppsala	Fyrishov	3,000

== Regular season ==
Pos	Team	Pld	W	L	PF	PA	PD	Pts	Qualification
1	Södertälje Kings	30	27	3	2687	2288	+399	57	Qualification to Playoffs
2	BC Luleå	30	22	8	3153	2821	+332	52	Qualification to Playoffs
3	Norrköping Dolphins	30	20	10	2639	2491	+148	50	Qualification to Playoffs
4	Borås Basket	30	18	12	2967	2772	+195	48	Qualification to Playoffs
5	KFUM Nässjö	30	16	14	2542	2554	−12	46	Qualification to Playoffs
6	Sundsvall Dragons	30	15	15	2755	2770	−15	45	Qualification to Playoffs
7	Uppsala Basket	30	14	16	2724	2676	+48	44	Qualification to Playoffs
8	Malbas	30	12	18	2412	2634	−222	42	Qualification to Playoffs
9	Jämtland Basket	30	11	19	2595	2702	−107	41	
10	ecoÖrebro	30	6	24	2461	2872	−411	36	
11	Umeå BSKT	30	4	26	2277	2632	−355	34	

Source: Basketligan

== Playoffs ==
Quarterfinals
1	Södertälje Kings	3
8	Malbas	0
4	Borås Basket	3
5	KFUM Nässjö	1
2	BC Luleå	3
7	Uppsala Basket	2
3	Norrköping Dolphins	3
6	Sundsvall Dragons	1

Semifinals
1	Södertälje Kings	4
4	Borås Basket	1
2	BC Luleå	2
3	Norrköping Dolphins	4

Finals
1	Södertälje Kings	4
3	Norrköping Dolphins	0

== Awards ==
On 4 April 2016, Joakim Kjellbom of Norrköping Dolphins won his third Basketligan MVP Award. Skyler Bowlin of Södertälje Kings won the Basketligan Finals MVP.
