= Johnell Smith =

American basketball player (born 1980)

Personal information
- Born: August 19, 1980 (age 46) Melrose, Florida, U.S.
- Listed height: 6 ft 1 in (1.85 m)

Career information
- High school: Interlachen (Interlachen, Florida); Keystone Heights Junior/Senior High (Keystone Heights, Florida)
- College: Santa Fe College (1999-2001); University of New Orleans
- Position: Guard

Johnell Smith (born August 19, 1980) is an American former professional basketball player.

== Career ==
A native of Melrose, Florida, Smith played high school basketball at Interlachen High School in Interlachen, Florida and at Keystone Heights Junior/Senior High in Keystone Heights, Florida.

The 6'1'' guard kicked off his college career at Santa Fe College (1999-2001). In January 2001, Smith scored 86 points against Vanier College, setting a new NJCAA record in most points scored in a single game. He scored 30.4 points per game in 2000–01. After transferring to the University of New Orleans, he appeared in 60 games for the Privateers until 2004, averaging 13.1 points, 3.3 rebounds, 2.8 assists as well as 1.6 steals per contest. Playing alongside Bo McCalebb, Smith received NABC District 8 Second Team honors in 2003-04.

Smith started his professional basketball career in Venezuela, playing at Guerreros de Caracas (2005), Marinos de Anzoátegui (2006), Macizos de Guayana (2007), Deportivo Tachira (2008) and La Guaira BBC (2008). He signed with the Svendborg Rabbits of Denmark's Basketligaen prior to the 2008–09 season. With Svendborg, Smith went all the way to the finals in 2009 and 2010, where they fell to the Bakken Bears in both years. Smith was named 2009-10 Basketligaen Player of the Year, he averaged 22.9 points, 7.0 rebounds, 3.4 assists and 2.8 steals in 36 Basketligaen appearances that season.

In 2010–11, Smith played for the Södertälje Kings in Sweden, where he continued his high scoring, tallying 19.9 points per contest in the Basketligan, to go along with 6.0 rebounds, 4.0 assists and 3.0 steals per game. He played for the Gainesville Galaxy in the Continental Basketball League (CBL) in the summer of 2011, and returned to Södertälje for the 2011–12 season. Scoring 17.9 points a contest, he led the Kings to the 2012 Basketligan finals, where they were defeated by the Norrköping Dolphins.

Smith went to Finland, signing with Korisliiga side Kataja Basket for the 2012-13 campaign. He averaged 12.5 points in 48 appearances in his single year in Finland, finishing the 2012–13 season in third place of the Korisliiga standings with his Kataja team. From 2013 to 2015, he had a second stint with the Svendborg Rabbits, receiving Basketligaen Player of the Year honors for the second time in his career (2013–14). He helped Svendborg win the Danish Cup competition that season. In Basketligaen play, Smith averaged 22.5 points, 5.2 rebounds, 5.7 assists and 2.5 steals per game in 2013–14.

After leaving Svendborg in 2015, he signed with the Norrköping Dolphins, where he played until 2019. Smith won the Swedish national championship with the Dolphins in 2018.

In September 2020, Smith signed with BK Vejen in Denmark, where he became player-head coach of the club's men's team as well as youth coach. He parted ways with the club in May 2024. On June, 1st 2024, Helsingborg BBK of Sweden announced the signing of Johnell Smith as head coach.
