= 08 Stockholm Human Rights =

- Leagues: Superettan
- Founded: 1996
- Arena: Åkeshovshallen, Bromma
- Location: Alvik, Sweden
- Team colors: Black and White
- President: Jonas Morin
- Head coach: Patrick Levy
- Championships: Men: 1 (2001); Women: 4 (2001, '03, '07, '10)
- Website: 08stockholm.se
Home	Away

08 Stockholm Human Rights is a Swedish basketball club located in Stockholm that has a men's and women's team.

The club was established in 1996 when two of the most successful basketball associations, Alvik BK (established 1956) and the South YMCA Basketball (established 1949), collaborated to form 08 Stockholm. The reason for the name of "Human Rights" is because of the club's active social commitment to using basketball as a tool to work against racism, for social inclusion and to educate their players and leaders in the club's core values.

Since their inception in 1996–97, the club has been very successful with both their men's and women's teams winning the league championship in 2001. The women's team has subsequently won three national championships (2003, 2007, 2010) since then, while the men's team previously won the inaugural Swedish-Finnish league championship in 1999. In 2013, the men's team was removed from the Basketligan because it didn't meet requirements set by the league. The club continued in the Superettan.

== Players ==
=== Current roster ===
08 Stockholm Human Rights roster
Players
Coaches

Pos.	No.	Nat.	Name	Ht.	Wt.	Age
G/F	4	(Sweden)	Porscke, Joel	1.91 m (6 ft 3 in)		34 – 6 October 1991
G	5	(Sweden)	Corell, Jesper	1.74 m (5 ft 9 in)		35 – 12 April 1991
C	6	(Sweden)	Guede, Jean	2.00 m (6 ft 7 in)		47 – 9 January 1979
G	7	(Sweden)	Ehlde, Jonas	1.88 m (6 ft 2 in)		34 – 14 January 1992
F	8	(Sweden)	Fant, Mikael
G	9	(Sweden)	Ilunga, Olivier	1.85 m (6 ft 1 in)		43 – 13 March 1983
F	10	(Sweden)	Thorangen, Adrian	1.95 m (6 ft 5 in)		32 – 13 November 1993
G	11	(Sweden)	Gullbrandsson, Emil	1.89 m (6 ft 2 in)		34 – 11 February 1992
F	12	(Sweden)	Cahilig, Andreas	1.90 m (6 ft 3 in)		35 – 23 January 1991
F	13	(Sweden)	Olsson-Drebold, Helge	1.98 m (6 ft 6 in)		37 – 16 May 1989
F	14	(Sweden)	Forsberg, Simon	1.97 m (6 ft 6 in)		36 – 16 June 1990
F	15	(Estonia)	Ilves, Timo	1.97 m (6 ft 6 in)		40 – 11 August 1986
G		(Sweden)	Lundin, Jimmy	1.84 m (6 ft 0 in)		36 – 5 June 1990
G/F		(Sweden)	Nystrom, Jim	1.94 m (6 ft 4 in)		43 – 5 October 1982
C		(Sweden)	Berg, Max	2.09 m (6 ft 10 in)		33 – 5 January 1993

Head coach

- (Sweden) Patrick Levy

Legend

- (C) Team captain
- Injured

- Roster
Updated: 2015-03-13

=== Depth chart ===
Pos.	Starting 5	Bench 1	Bench 2
C	Simon Forsberg	Helge Olsson-Drebold	Max Berg
PF	Timo Ilves	Mikael Fant	Jean Guede
SF	Adrian Thorangen	Andreas Cahilig	Jim Nystrom
SG	Jonas Ehlde	Joel Porscke	Jimmy Lundin
PG	Olivier Ilunga	Emil Gullbrandsson	Jesper Corell

== Notable past players ==
- (United States) Kodi Augustus
- (United States) Jerel Blassingame
- (United States) Rodney Hamilton
- (Sweden) / (Turkey) Erkan Inan
- (United States) Landry Kosmalski
- (Estonia) Martin Müürsepp
- (Lithuania) Ronaldas Rutkauskas
- (Turkey) Tolga Tekinalp
