= Sundsvall Dragons =

Swedish basketball club

- Leagues: Ligan
- Founded: 7 May 1939; 86 years ago
- Dissolved: 6 May 2016; 9 years ago
- Arena: Sundsvalls Sporthall
- Capacity: 2,300
- Location: Sundsvall, Sweden
- Team colors: Navy, Red
- Championships: 2 Swedish Championships
Home	Away

Sundsvall Dragons was a professional Swedish basketball club from Sundsvall. The Dragons made it to the Basketligan Finals five times: in 2005, 2008, 2013 and in 2009 and 2011 as winners.

== History ==
The team was one of the oldest in Sweden, as it was founded on May 9, 1939. In 1993 the team promoted to the Basketligan and was named the Sundsvall Dragons.

In 2008, 6-time NBA champion and 7-time All-Star Scottie Pippen played for the team. Pippen, at age 42, played one game for Sundsvall in which he recorded 21 points, 12 rebounds and 6 assists. Pippen was paid $66,000 to play in the game against Akropal.

On 6 May 2016 the club was declared bankrupt.

== Championships ==
- Swedish Championships: 2

2008–09, 2010–11

== Season by season ==
Season	Tier	League	Pos.	Postseason
2010–11	1	Basketligan	1	Champion
2011–12	1	Basketligan	3	Quarterfinalist
2012–13	1	Basketligan	1	Finalist
2013–14	1	Basketligan	4	Quarterfinalist
2014–15	1	Basketligan	5	Semifinalist
2015–16	1	Basketligan	6	Quarterfinalist

== Notable players ==
Note: Flags indicate national team eligibility at FIBA-sanctioned events. Players may hold other non-FIBA nationalities not displayed.

Criteria

To appear in this section a player must have either:

- Set a club record or won an individual award while at the club
- Played at least one official international match for their national team at any time
- Played at least one official NBA match at any time.

- (Iceland) Hlynur Bæringsson
- (Iceland) Pavel Ermolinskij
- (Iceland) Ragnar Nathanaelsson
- (United States) Scottie Pippen
- (Australia) Liam Rush
- (United States) Alex Wesby
- (United States) Ray Willis
