= Norrköping Dolphins =

- Leagues: Basketligan
- Founded: May 8, 1963; 63 years ago
- History: Hageby BK; 1963–1992; Norrköping Dolphins; 1992–present
- Arena: Stadium Arena
- Capacity: 3,500
- Location: Norrköping, Sweden
- Head coach: Johs Andersen, Paulius Dambrauskas
- 2021–22 position: Basketligan, 1st of 8
- Championships: 10 Swedish Leagues
- Website: Link
Home	Away

The Norrköping Dolphins are a professional basketball club from Norrköping, Sweden. It plays in the Basketligan, the highest league in Sweden and won the league ten times. Home games of Norrköping are played at the Stadium Arena.

== History ==
The club was established as Hageby BK (Swedish: Hageby Basketklubb) on May 8, 1963, by Åke Björck. Its name was taken from the Hageby district in Norrköping.

The men's team made its debut in the Swedish first tier in 1964–65 but were relegated after only one year. They returned eleven years later, in 1976–77, with the American players Fran O'Hanlon and Kenny Grant on the roster.

In 1980, Hageby won its first national championship after defeating Alviks BK in the finals, 3–1.

In 1992 the Swedish basketball league was formed and the club changed its name to Norrköping Dolphins.

== Arena ==
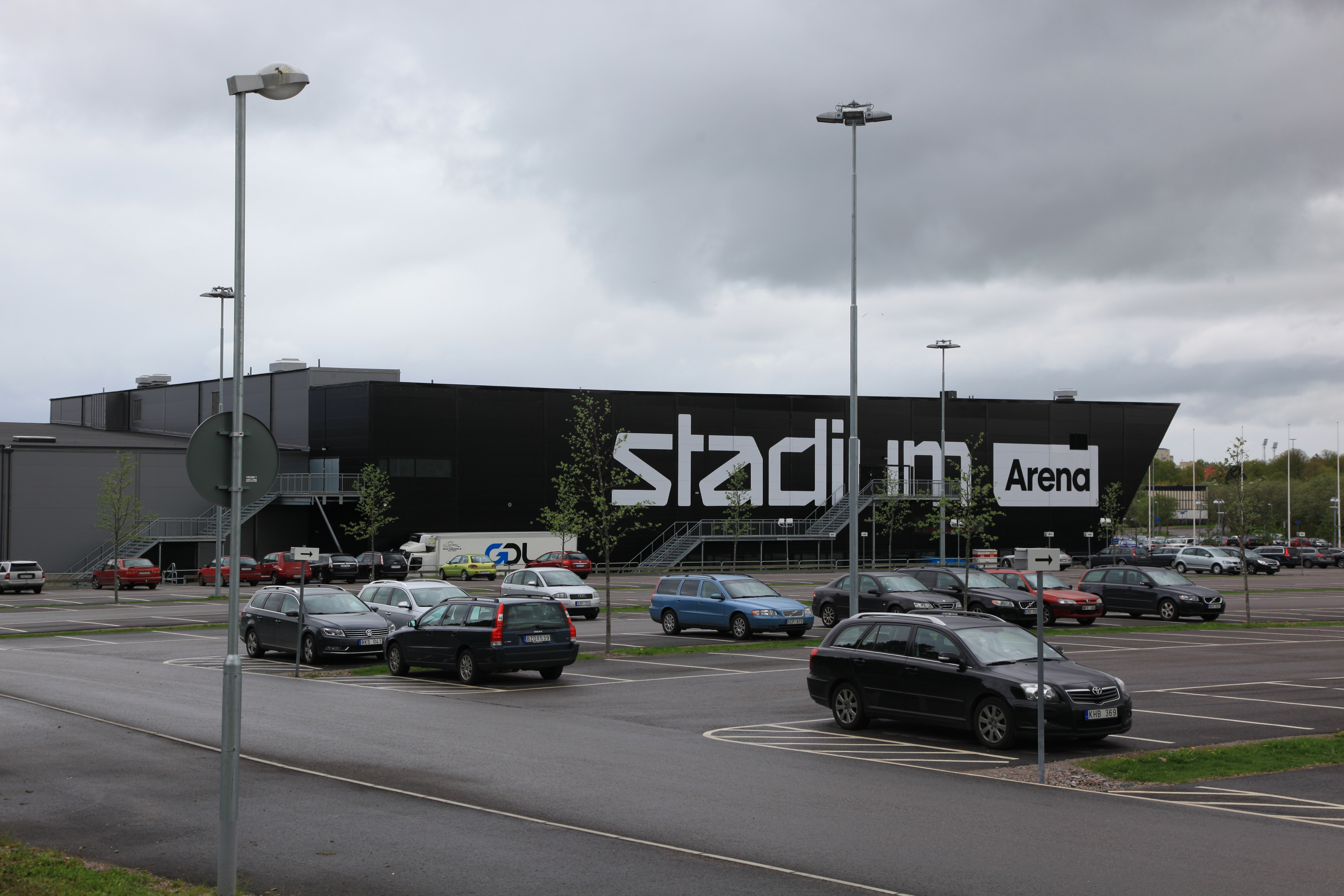
The Stadium Arena

The Stadium Arena is the home arena of the Dolphins since its opening in December 2008. It holds capacity for 3,500 people.

== Trophies ==
Basketligan

- Winners (10): 1979–80, 1997–98, 2009–10, 2011–12, 2017–18, 2020–21, 2021–22, 2022–23, 2023–24, 2024–25
- Runners-up (1): 2010–11, 2013–14, 2015–16

== Season by season ==
Season	Tier	League	Pos.	European competitions	
2010–11	1	Basketligan	2nd	3 EuroChallenge	T16
2011–12	1	Basketligan	1st	3 EuroChallenge	RS
2012–13	1	Basketligan	4th	3 EuroChallenge	T16
2013–14	1	Basketligan	2nd		
2014–15	1	Basketligan	5th		
2015–16	1	Basketligan	2nd		
2016–17	1	Basketligan	3rd		
2017–18	1	Basketligan	1st		
2018–19	1	Basketligan	3rd/4th	3 Champions League	QR1
2019–20	1	Basketligan	7th		
2020–21	1	Basketligan	1st		
2021–22	1	Basketligan	1st		
2022–23	1	Basketligan	1st	3 Champions League	QR1
2022–23	1	Basketligan	1st	4 FIBA Europe Cup	RS
2023–24	1	Basketligan	1st	3 Champions League	QR3
2023–24	1	Basketligan	1st	4 FIBA Europe Cup	RS
2024–25	1	Basketligan	1st	3 Champions League	QR2
2024–25	1	Basketligan	1st	4 FIBA Europe Cup	RS

== Players ==
=== Roster ===
Note: Flags indicate national team eligibility at FIBA-sanctioned events. Players may hold other non-FIBA nationalities not displayed.

Norrköping Dolphins roster
Players
Coaches

Pos.	No.	Nat.	Name
G	0	(Sweden)	Tim Schuberg
F	5	(United States)	Ryker Cisarik
G	9	(Sweden)	Mahrcus Forlini
F	13	(Sweden)	Jacob Hadi
F	15	(Sweden)	Pierre Hampton
F	20	(Sweden)	Joakim Dumon
G	21	(Sweden)	Hugo Bergström
G	23	(United States)	Dallion Johnson
C	25	(Sweden)	Sebastian Forsling
C	34	(United States)	Ben Middlebrooks
F	88	(United States)	Zach Harvey
G	94	(Sweden)	Nathan Dawit

Head coach

(Sweden) Adam Engström

Assistant coach(es)

(Lithuania) Paulius Dambrauskas
(Sweden) Kevin Taylor Lundgren

Legend

- (C) Team captain
- Injured

- Roster
Updated: 6 January 2026

=== Notable players ===
Note: Flags indicate national team eligibility at FIBA-sanctioned events. Players may hold other non-FIBA nationalities not displayed.

Criteria

To appear in this section a player must have either:

- Set a club record or won an individual award while at the club
- Played at least one official international match for their national team at any time
- Played at least one official NBA match at any time.

- (Canada) Jackson Rowe
- (Sweden) Joakim Kjellbom
- (United States) Ken Brown
- (Denmark) Zarko Jukic

== Women's team ==
The Dolphins also have a women's team playing in the highest Swedish level and have won the championship in 2000, 2013 and 2022. In the 1999–2000 season, they were known as Norrköping Flamingos.
