= 2011 FIBA Europe Under-20 Championship =

International basketball competition

2011 FIBA U20 European Championship
14th FIBA Under-20 European Basketball Championship

Tournament details
- Host country: Spain
- Dates: 14–24 July 2011
- Teams: 16 (from 1 federation)
- Venues: 2 (in 1 host city)

Final positions
- Champions: Spain (1st title)

Tournament statistics
- MVP: (Spain) Nikola Mirotić
- Top scorer: (Spain) Nikola Mirotić (27.0)
- Top rebounds: (Turkey) Furkan Aldemir (15.9)
- Top assists: (Spain) Josep Franch (5.1)
- PPG (Team): Spain (87.2)
- RPG (Team): Turkey (43.7)
- APG (Team): Spain (17.0)

Official website
- Official website (archive)

The 2011 FIBA Europe Under-20 Championship was the 14th edition of the FIBA Europe Under-20 Championship. The competition featured 16 teams, held in Bilbao, Basque Country, Spain from July 14–24. Spain became a champion for the first time.

== Participating teams ==
- Austria ▲ (Winners, 2010 FIBA Europe Under-20 Championship Division B)
- Croatia
- France
- Germany
- Greece
- Italy
- Latvia
- Lithuania
- Montenegro
- Russia
- Serbia
- Slovenia
- Spain
- Sweden ▲ (Runners-up, 2010 FIBA Europe Under-20 Championship Division B)
- Turkey
- Ukraine

== Group stages ==
=== Preliminary round ===
In this round, the sixteen teams are allocated in four groups of four teams each. The top three will advance to the Qualifying Round. The last team of each group will play for the 13th–16th place in the Classification Games.

Team advance to Qualifying Round
Team compete in Classification Round

Times given below are in CEST (UTC+2).

==== Group A ====
Team	Pld	W	L	PF	PA	PD	Pts	Tiebreaker
Russia	3	2	1	215	204	+11	5	
Montenegro	3	2	1	231	205	+26	5	
Slovenia	3	1	2	245	245	0	4	
Serbia	3	1	2	212	249	−37	4	

14 July 2011
13:00

Report

Montenegro	80–77	Slovenia
Scoring by quarter: 17–21, 14–28, 25–15, 24–13
Pts: Dubljević 30; Rebs: Todorović, Dubljević 12; Asts: Dukanovic 8		Pts: Omic 28; Rebs: Murić 9 Asts: Span 5

Bilbao Arena, Bilbao
Referees: Antonio Conde (ESP), Regis Bardera (FRA), Nebojša Kovačević (GER)

14 July 2011
15:45

Report

Russia	62–72	Serbia
Scoring by quarter: 17–18, 19–28, 13–14, 13–12
Pts: Strebkov 13; Rebs: Korshakov 8 Asts: Strebkov, Korshakov 3		Pts: Jaramaz 15; Rebs: Kalinić 7 Asts: Jaramaz 3

Bilbao Arena, Bilbao
Referees: Miguel Perez Perez (ESP), Robert Tanner Cervo (CAN), Sérgio Silva (POR)

15 July 2011
14:00

Report

Slovenia	66–85	Russia
Scoring by quarter: 21–20, 19–24, 15–24, 11–17
Pts: Pajić 18; Rebs: Omić 6 Asts: Prepelič, Špan 3		Pts: Zubkov 19; Rebs: Balashov 9 Asts: three players 3

La Casilla Arena, Bilbao
Referees: Oscar Lefwerth (SWE), Damian James Lyons (AUS), Haris Bijedić (BIH)

15 July 2011
18:30

Report

Serbia	60–85	Montenegro
Scoring by quarter: 18–17, 17–23, 10–28, 15–17
Pts: Anđušić 13; Rebs: four players 4 Asts: Jaramaz, Kalinić 3		Pts: Dubljević 17; Rebs: Todorović, Kanačević 12; Asts: Đukanović 7

La Casilla Arena, Bilbao
Referees: Luigi Lamonica (ITA), Jurgis Laurinavicius (LTU), Gentian Cici (ALB)

16 July 2011
14:00

Report

Montenegro	66–68	Russia
Scoring by quarter: 18–17, 17–16, 20–19, 11–16
Pts: Dubljević 25; Rebs: Dubljević 10; Asts: Ivanović, Đukanović 3		Pts: Balashov, Zubkov 13; Rebs: Korshakov, Balashov 5 Asts: Strebkov 5

Bilbao Arena, Bilbao
Referees: Sreten Radović (CRO), Regis Bardera (FRA), Andris Aunkrogers (LAT)

16 July 2011
20:45

Report

Serbia	80–102	Slovenia
Scoring by quarter: 14–23, 23–23, 26–38, 17–18
Pts: Nedović 26; Rebs: Ognjenović 5 Asts: Nikolić, Nedović 3		Pts: Pajić 24; Rebs: Murić 11; Asts: Prepelič 6

La Casilla Arena, Bilbao
Referees: Oscar Lefwerth (SWE), Nikolaos Somos (GRE), Zafer Yilmaz (TUR)

==== Group B ====
Team	Pld	W	L	PF	PA	PD	Pts	Tiebreaker
France	3	3	0	207	134	+73	6	
Sweden	3	1	2	182	194	−12	4	1–1
Latvia	3	1	2	163	196	−33	4	1–1
Croatia	3	1	2	149	177	−28	4	1–1

14 July 2011
13:00

Report

Croatia	33–49	France
Scoring by quarter: 8–12, 7–13, 9–11, 9–13
Pts: Batur 10; Rebs: Barać 9 Asts: six players 1		Pts: Fournier 18; Rebs: Westermann, Yeguete 8 Asts: Westermann 3

La Casilla Arena, Bilbao
Referees: Luigi Lamonica (ITA), Nikolaos Somos (GRE), Damian James Lyons (AUS)

14 July 2011
21:15

Report

Sweden	57–59	Latvia
Scoring by quarter: 17–25, 18–14, 13–9, 9–11
Pts: Gaddefors 14; Rebs: Czerapowicz 10; Asts: Barton, Engström 2		Pts: Antrops 13; Rebs: Dukulis 9 Asts: Pinete 3

La Casilla Arena, Bilbao
Attendance: 100
Referees: Marcin Kowalski (POL), Sergiy Chebyshev (UKR), Gentian Cici (ALB)

15 July 2011
16:15

Report

France	79–55	Sweden
Scoring by quarter: 29–20, 14–9, 23–18, 13–8
Pts: Fournier 16; Rebs: Gobert 8 Asts: Westermann 4		Pts: Czerapowicz 21; Rebs: Czerapowicz 4 Asts: Barton 3

La Casilla Arena, Bilbao
Referees: Robert Lottermoser (GER), Robert Tanner Cervo (CAN), Sašo Petek (SLO)

15 July 2011
20:45

Report

Latvia	58–60	Croatia
Scoring by quarter: 11–18, 14–17, 16–10, 17–15
Pts: Antrops 19; Rebs: Meiers 11; Asts: Lejasmeiers, Meiers 4		Pts: Buva 13; Rebs: three players 6 Asts: Batur, Mikulić 3

La Casilla Arena, Bilbao
Referees: Miguel Perez Perez (ESP), Igor Dragojević (MNE), Zafer Yilmaz (TUR)

16 July 2011
16:15

Report

Sweden	70–56	Croatia
Scoring by quarter: 14–16, 18–16, 20–14, 18–10
Pts: Czerapowicz 17; Rebs: Czerapowicz 13; Asts: three players 2		Pts: Barać 14; Rebs: Barać 7 Asts: Došen 3

Bilbao Arena, Bilbao

16 July 2011
18:30

Report

France	79–46	Latvia
Scoring by quarter: 24–12, 14–3, 21–12, 20–19
Pts: Fournier 23; Rebs: Gobert 7 Asts: Yeguete 2		Pts: Meiers 13; Rebs: four players 4 Asts: Butjankovs 3

Bilbao Arena, Bilbao
Referees: Marcin Kowalski (POL), Igor Dragojević (MNE), Zoran Mitrovski (MKD)

==== Group C ====
Team	Pld	W	L	PF	PA	PD	Pts	Tiebreaker
Spain	3	3	0	304	165	+139	6	
Greece	3	2	1	224	208	+16	5	
Turkey	3	1	2	176	235	−59	4	
Austria	3	0	3	165	261	−96	3	

14 July 2011
18:00

Report

Austria	51–69	Greece
Scoring by quarter: 21–18, 13–12, 9–11, 8–28
Pts: Maresch 15; Rebs: Linzer, Rados 6 Asts: Klepeisz 3		Pts: Psaropoulos, Chrysikopoulos 16; Rebs: three players 6 Asts: Chrysikopoulos 4

Bilbao Arena, Bilbao
Referees: Jurgis Laurinavicius (LTU), Sašo Petek (SLO), Andris Aunkrogers (LAT)

14 July 2011
20:45

Report

Spain	90–41	Turkey
Scoring by quarter: 24–10, 15–10, 28–7, 23–14
Pts: Sastre 16; Rebs: Tomàs 6 Asts: Pozas 6		Pts: Köksal 10; Rebs: Aldemir 11; Asts: three players 2

Bilbao Arena, Bilbao
Referees: Robert Lottermoser (GER), Igor Dragojević (MNE), Sergey Mikhaylov (RUS)

15 July 2011
18:30

Report

Turkey	72–67	Austria
Scoring by quarter: 17–24, 18–20, 19–19, 18–4
Pts: Aldemir 22; Rebs: Aldemir 12; Asts: Köksal 6		Pts: Maresch 18; Rebs: Krämer 7 Asts: Klepeisz 5

Bilbao Arena, Bilbao
Referees: Aleksandar Glišić (SRB), Sergiy Chebyshev (UKR), Zoran Mitrovski (MKD)

15 July 2011
20:45

Report

Greece	77–94	Spain
Scoring by quarter: 18–24, 19–22, 22–22, 18–26
Pts: Chrysikopoulos 20; Rebs: Chrysikopoulos 8 Asts: Katsivelis 4		Pts: Mirotić 32; Rebs: Mirotić 10; Asts: Franch 6

Bilbao Arena, Bilbao
Referees: Sreten Radović (CRO), Marcin Kowalski (POL), Regis Bardera (FRA)

16 July 2011
18:30

Report

Turkey	63–78	Greece
Scoring by quarter: 14–29, 15–17, 21–16, 13–16
Pts: Aldemir 19; Rebs: Aldemir 17; Asts: Köksal 2		Pts: Katsivelis 23; Rebs: Katsivelis 10; Asts: Chrysikopoulos 6

La Casilla Arena, Bilbao
Referees: Robert Lottermoser (GER), Sérgio Silva (POR), Robert Tanner Cervo (CAN)

16 July 2011
20:45

Report

Austria	47–120	Spain
Scoring by quarter: 12–27, 10–38, 15–31, 10–24
Pts: Novas 12; Rebs: Rados 10; Asts: Krämer 3		Pts: Mirotić 28; Rebs: Tomàs, Mirotić 7 Asts: Franch 9

Bilbao Arena, Bilbao
Referees: Jurgis Laurinavicius (LTU), Sašo Petek (SLO), Zoran Mitrovski (MKD)

==== Group D ====
Team	Pld	W	L	PF	PA	PD	Pts	Tiebreaker
Italy	3	2	1	222	198	+24	5	
Germany	3	2	1	222	216	+6	5	
Ukraine	3	1	2	195	205	−10	4	
Lithuania	3	1	2	218	238	−20	4	

14 July 2011
15:15

Report

Italy	77–82	Lithuania
Scoring by quarter: 18–18, 21–21, 16–19, 22–24
Pts: Polonara 18; Rebs: Melli 10; Asts: Moraschini 4		Pts: Kulvietis 32; Rebs: Kulvietis 10; Asts: Redikas 7

La Casilla Arena, Bilbao
Attendance: 100
Referees: Sreten Radović (CRO), Aleksandar Glišić (SRB), Zafer Yilmaz (TUR)

14 July 2011
17:30

Report

Ukraine	68–72	Germany
Scoring by quarter: 11–20, 12–10, 14–18, 31–24
Pts: Lebedintsev 18; Rebs: Lebedintsev 9 Asts: Lebedintsev 5		Pts: Heckmann 22; Rebs: Barthel, Theis 6 Asts: Wendt 4

La Casilla Arena, Bilbao
Referees: Oscar Lefwerth (SWE), Haris Bijedić (BIH), Zoran Mitrovski (MKD)

15 July 2011
14:00

Report

Lithuania	63–73	Ukraine
Scoring by quarter: 18–22, 22–16, 12–18, 11–17
Pts: Kupsas 21; Rebs: Kupsas 8 Asts: Peciukevicius 6		Pts: Artem Pustovyi 22; Rebs: Bobrov 14; Asts: Lebedintsev 7

Bilbao Arena, Bilbao
Referees: Sergey Mikhaylov (RUS), Nikolaos Somos (GRE), Andris Aunkrogers (LAT)

15 July 2011
16:15

Report

Germany	62–75	Italy
Scoring by quarter: 14–23, 17–17, 22–18, 9–17
Pts: Theis 15; Rebs: Theis 15; Asts: Wendt 4		Pts: Gentile 24; Rebs: Gentile 7 Asts: Gentile 4

Bilbao Arena, Bilbao
Referees: Antonio Conde (ESP), Sérgio Silva (POR), Nebojša Kovačević (GER)

16 July 2011
14:00

Report

Ukraine	54–70	Italy
Scoring by quarter: 13–16, 10–17, 7–19, 24–18
Pts: Lebedintsev 14; Rebs: Sandul, Bobrov 8 Asts: Lebedintsev, Bobrov 3		Pts: Polonara 15; Rebs: Polonara, Melli 6 Asts: Nicolao 3

La Casilla Arena, Bilbao
Referees: Antonio Conde (ESP), Gentian Cici (ALB), Damian James Lyons (AUS)

16 July 2011
16:15

Report

Lithuania	73–88	Germany
Scoring by quarter: 31–26, 14–18, 7–17, 21–27
Pts: Peciukevičius 18; Rebs: Kulvietis 10; Asts: Peciukevičius 6		Pts: Giffey 16; Rebs: Theis 9 Asts: Heckmann 4

La Casilla Arena, Bilbao
Referees: Miguel Perez Perez (ESP), Aleksandar Glišić (SRB), Sergey Mikhaylov (RUS)

=== Qualifying round ===
The twelve teams remaining will be allocated in two groups of six teams each. The four top teams advance to the quarterfinals. The last two teams of each group play for the 9th–12th place.

Team advance to Quarterfinals
Team compete in 9th–12th playoffs

==== Group E ====
Team	Pld	W	L	PF	PA	PD	Pts	Tiebreaker
France	5	5	0	361	271	+90	10	
Russia	5	4	1	358	325	+33	9	
Montenegro	5	3	2	336	337	−1	8	
Latvia	5	2	3	308	362	−54	7	
Sweden	5	1	4	324	353	−29	6	
Slovenia	5	0	5	359	398	−39	5	

18 July 2011
16:15

Report

Sweden	78–80	Montenegro
Scoring by quarter: 16–21, 20–26, 26–19, 16–14
Pts: Czerapowicz 20; Rebs: Czerapowicz 7 Asts: Czerapowicz 4		Pts: Dubljević 34; Rebs: Dubljević 12; Asts: Đukanović 3

La Casilla Arena, Bilbao
Referees: Antonio Conde (ESP), Damian James Lyons (AUS), Nikolaos Somos (GRE)

18 July 2011
18:30

Report

Slovenia	64–75	France
Scoring by quarter: 9–18, 24–21, 13–15, 18–21
Pts: Murić 16; Rebs: Murić 9 Asts: Nikolić, Špan 2		Pts: Fournier 19; Rebs: Prénom, Fournier 6 Asts: four players 2

La Casilla Arena, Bilbao
Referees: Miguel Perez Perez (ESP), Haris Bijedić (BIH), Zafer Yilmaz (TUR)

18 July 2011
20:45

Report

Latvia	58–81	Russia
Scoring by quarter: 15–21, 15–22, 14–19, 14–19
Pts: Mejeris 14; Rebs: Mejeris 7 Asts: Osins 3		Pts: Zubkov 20; Rebs: Zubkov 8 Asts: Strebkov 5

La Casilla Arena, Bilbao
Referees: Robert Lottermoser (GER), Zoran Mitrovski (MKD), Nebojša Kovačević (GER)

19 July 2011
16:15

Report

Russia	67–65	Sweden
Scoring by quarter: 26–18, 13–20, 19–10, 9–17
Pts: Zubkov 13; Rebs: Tkachenko 7 Asts: Shamov 4		Pts: Gaddefors 17; Rebs: Gaddefors 8 Asts: Barton 4

La Casilla Arena, Bilbao
Referees: Antonio Conde (ESP), Haris Bijedić (BIH), Sergiy Chebyshev (UKR)

19 July 2011
16:15

Report

Montenegro	49–58	France
Scoring by quarter: 10–16, 9–6, 13–16, 17–20
Pts: Dubljević 17; Rebs: Dubljević 7 Asts: Đukanović 3		Pts: Hillotte 12; Rebs: Yeguete 5 Asts: Fournier, Westermann 2

Bilbao Arena, Bilbao
Referees: Luigi Lamonica (ITA), Robert Tanner Cervo (CAN), Zoran Mitrovski (MKD)

19 July 2011
18:30

Report

Latvia	89–84	Slovenia
Scoring by quarter: 21–13, 23–24, 19–31, 26–16
Pts: Mejeris 20; Rebs: Mejeris 11; Asts: Pinete 5		Pts: Prepelič 17; Rebs: Pajić 6 Asts: Prepelič, Špan 5

Bilbao Arena, Bilbao
Referees: Jurgis Laurinavicius (LTU), Igor Dragojević (MNE), Nikolaos Somos (GRE)

20 July 2011
16:15

Report

Montenegro	61–56	Latvia
Scoring by quarter: 9–10, 25–22, 12–6, 15–18
Pts: Dubljevic 18; Rebs: Todorović 11; Asts: Dobrovic, Ivanovic 2		Pts: Mejeris, Bricis 13; Rebs: Mejeris 9 Asts: three players 2

La Casilla Arena, Bilbao
Referees: Miguel Perez Perez (ESP), Sergiy Chebyshev (UKR), Nebojša Kovačević (GER)

20 July 2011
18:30

Report

Sweden	69–68	Slovenia
Scoring by quarter: 22–16, 17–20, 11–15, 19–17
Pts: Lindqvist 16; Rebs: Person 11; Asts: three players 3		Pts: Pajić 21; Rebs: Nikolić 8 Asts: Špan 3

La Casilla Arena, Bilbao
Referees: Aleksandar Glišić (SRB), Robert Tanner Cervo (CAN), Zafer Yilmaz (TUR)

20 July 2011
20:45

Report

France	70–57	Russia
Scoring by quarter: 21–12, 17–9, 20–19, 12–17
Pts: Fournier 24; Rebs: Gobert 8 Asts: Westermann, Yeguete 3		Pts: Tumanov 14; Rebs: Barinov 6 Asts: Tkachenko, Tumanov 3

La Casilla Arena, Bilbao
Referees: Robert Lottermoser (GER), Gentian Cici (ALB), Haris Bijedić (BIH)

==== Group F ====
Team	Pld	W	L	PF	PA	PD	Pts	Tiebreaker
Spain	5	5	0	419	328	+91	10	
Italy	5	4	1	363	324	+39	9	
Turkey	5	2	3	298	347	−49	7	1–0
Germany	5	2	3	311	338	−27	7	0–1
Ukraine	5	1	4	329	351	−22	6	1–0
Greece	5	1	4	338	370	−32	6	0–1

18 July 2011
16:15

Report

Germany	70–51	Greece
Scoring by quarter: 22–16, 10–11, 13–11, 25–13
Pts: Theis 19; Rebs: Theis 19; Asts: Heckmann, Wendt 3		Pts: Katsivelis 13; Rebs: Chrysikopoulos 6 Asts: Chrysikopoulos, Antonakis 3

Bilbao Arena, Bilbao
Referees: Aleksandar Glišić (SRB), Igor Dragojević (MNE), Robert Tanner Cervo (CAN)

18 July 2011
18:30

Report

Turkey	59–69	Italy
Scoring by quarter: 17–26, 19–16, 11–18, 12–9
Pts: Köksal 19; Rebs: Köksal, Aldemir 19; Asts: Mutaf, Köksal 3		Pts: Melli 14; Rebs: Melli 14; Asts: Melli 3

Bilbao Arena, Bilbao
Referees: Sreten Radović (CRO), Gentian Cici (ALB), Regis Bardera (FRA)

18 July 2011
20:45

Report

Ukraine	67–72	Spain
Scoring by quarter: 17–17, 10–15, 27–20, 13–20
Pts: Lypovyy 23; Rebs: Lypovyy 8 Asts: Lebedintsev, Bobrov 3		Pts: Mirotić 41; Rebs: Mirotić 14; Asts: Franch 4

Bilbao Arena, Bilbao
Referees: Jurgis Laurinavicius (LTU), Andris Aunkrogers (LAT), Sašo Petek (SLO)

19 July 2011
18:30

Report

Ukraine	61–64	Turkey
Scoring by quarter: 21–15, 15–20, 15–9, 10–20
Pts: Sandul 14; Rebs: Sandul 12; Asts: Lebedintsev 4		Pts: Şanlı 18; Rebs: Aldemir 7 Asts: Mutaf 5

La Casilla Arena, Bilbao
Referees: Marcin Kowalski (POL), Sergey Mikhaylov (RUS), Nebojša Kovačević (GER)

19 July 2011
20:45

Report

Spain	73–58	Germany
Scoring by quarter: 17–12, 11–18, 25–16, 20–12
Pts: Mirotić 22; Rebs: Mirotić 12; Asts: Sastre 3		Pts: Theis 11; Rebs: Klein 4 Asts: Heckmann 2

Bilbao Arena, Bilbao
Referees: Aleksandar Glišić (SRB), Sérgio Silva (POR), Damian James Lyons (AUS)

19 July 2011
20:45

Report

Greece	59–64	Italy
Scoring by quarter: 18–16, 14–14, 14–25, 13–9
Pts: Katsivelis 12; Rebs: Antonakis 9 Asts: Psaropoulos, Antonakis 2		Pts: Gentile 23; Rebs: De Nicolao 8 Asts: Moraschini, De Nicolao 3

La Casilla Arena, Bilbao
Referees: Oscar Lefwerth (SWE), Regis Bardera (FRA), Sašo Petek (SLO)

20 July 2011
16:15

Report

Germany	49–71	Turkey
Scoring by quarter: 11–28, 18–17, 4–16, 16–10
Pts: Theis 12; Rebs: Theis 8 Asts: Heckmann 8		Pts: Aldemir 17; Rebs: Aldemir 25; Asts: three players 3

Bilbao Arena, Bilbao
Referees: Marcin Kowalski (POL), Sergey Mikhaylov (RUS), Zoran Mitrovski (MKD)

20 July 2011
18:30

Report

Greece	73–79	Ukraine
Scoring by quarter: 13–21, 16–15, 13–25, 31–18
Pts: Katsivelis, Koukoulas 22; Rebs: Papapetrou 7 Asts: Katsivelis 5		Pts: Bobrov 18; Rebs: Lypovyy 12; Asts: Lypovyy 8

Bilbao Arena, Bilbao
Referees: Regis Bardera (FRA), Jurgis Laurinavicius (LTU), Damian James Lyons (AUS)

20 July 2011
20:45

Report

Italy	85–90	Spain
Scoring by quarter: 21–24, 16–26, 23–19, 25–21
Pts: Gentile 22; Rebs: Gentile, Polonara 7 Asts: Moraschini 4		Pts: Mirotić 27; Rebs: Mirotić 12; Asts: Franch 5

Bilbao Arena, Bilbao
Referees: Oscar Lefwerth (SWE), Igor Dragojević (MNE), Andris Aunkrogers (LAT

=== Classification round ===
The last teams of each group in the preliminary round will compete in this Classification Round. The four teams will play in one group. The last two teams will be relegated to Division B for the next season.

==== Group G ====
Relegated to Division B

Team	Pld	W	L	PF	PA	PD	Pts	Tiebreaker
Serbia	6	6	0	515	384	+131	12	
Lithuania	6	3	3	468	450	+18	9	
Austria	6	2	4	366	473	−107	8	
Croatia	6	1	5	412	454	−32	7	

18 July 2011
14:00

Report

Croatia	61–64	Austria
Scoring by quarter: 14–19, 16–14, 18–17, 13–14
Pts: Babić 18; Rebs: Bubalo 9 Asts: four players 3		Pts: Linzer 14; Rebs: Maresch, Radoš 10; Asts: Klepeisz 6

Bilbao Arena, Bilbao
Referees: Oscar Lefwerth (SWE), Marcin Kowalski (POL), Sergey Mikhaylov (RUS)

18 July 2011
14:00

Report

Serbia	95–64	Lithuania
Scoring by quarter: 24–20, 23–10, 27–16, 21–18
Pts: Anđušić 21; Rebs: Kalinić 8 Asts: Nedović 7		Pts: Redikas, Dambrauskas 15; Rebs: Biruta 7 Asts: Kulvietis 3

La Casilla Arena, Bilbao
Referees: Luigi Lamonica (ITA), Sérgio Silva (POR), Sergiy Chebyshev (UKR)

19 July 2011
14:00

Report

Austria	64–83	Serbia
Scoring by quarter: 12–23, 17–22, 21–19, 14–19
Pts: Radoš 13; Rebs: Frühwirth 7 Asts: Friedrich 5		Pts: Anđušić 16; Rebs: Đekić 10; Asts: Anđušić 4

La Casilla Arena, Bilbao
Referees: Robert Lottermoser (GER), Gentian Cici (ALB), Andris Aunkrogers (LAT)

19 July 2011
14:00

Report

Lithuania	76–82	Croatia
Scoring by quarter: 18–21, 25–23, 24–18, 9–20
Pts: Kulvietis 17; Rebs: Staniulis 8 Asts: Redikas 7		Pts: Bubalo 25; Rebs: Babić 9 Asts: Rogić 6

Bilbao Arena, Bilbao
Referees: Miguel Perez Perez (ESP), Regis Bardera (FRA), Zafer Yilmaz (TUR)

20 July 2011
14:00

Report

Serbia	80–79	Croatia
Scoring by quarter: 18–20, 22–19, 20–19, 20–21
Pts: Nedović 27; Rebs: Kalinić 7 Asts: Nedović 7		Pts: Barać 23; Rebs: Bubalo 7 Asts: Mikulić 6

La Casilla Arena, Bilbao
Referees: Luigi Lamonica (ITA), Sérgio Silva (POR), Nikolaos Somos (GRE)

20 July 2011
14:00

Report

Austria	68–91	Lithuania
Scoring by quarter: 25–24, 19–16, 15–24, 9–27
Pts: Klepeisz 17; Rebs: Vieider, Rados 6 Asts: Klepeisz 7		Pts: Kulvietis 22; Rebs: Kulvietis 13; Asts: Varanauskas, Redikas 4

Bilbao Arena, Bilbao
Referees: Antonio Conde (ESP), Haris Bijedić (BIH), Sašo Petek (SLO)

22 July 2011
14:00

Report

Lithuania	67–75	Serbia
Scoring by quarter: 22–16, 17–19, 11–17, 17–23
Pts: Redikas 22; Rebs: three players 6 Asts: Dambrauskas 6		Pts: Nedović 18; Rebs: Đekić 6 Asts: Jaramaz 4

La Casilla Arena, Bilbao
Referees: Robert Lottermoser (GER), Regis Bardera (FRA), Robert Tanner Cervo (CAN)

22 July 2011
16:15

Report

Austria	61–59	Croatia
Scoring by quarter: 16–9, 18–11, 11–28, 16–11
Pts: Maresch 19; Rebs: Radoš 10; Asts: Klepeisz 3		Pts: Barać 19; Rebs: Barać 7 Asts: Batur 4

La Casilla Arena, Bilbao
Referees: Miguel Perez Perez (ESP), Sergiy Chebyshev (UKR), Damian James Lyons (AUS)

23 July 2011
14:00

Report

Croatia	68–92	Lithuania
Scoring by quarter: 17–26, 28–18, 14–26, 9–22
Pts: Batur, Dukan 11; Rebs: Buva 6 Asts: Rogić 5		Pts: Redikas 19; Rebs: Staniulis 11; Asts: Peciukevicius 4

La Casilla Arena, Bilbao
Referees: Luigi Lamonica (ITA), Marcin Kowalski (POL), Nikolaos Somos (GRE)

23 July 2011
16:15

Report

Serbia	101–47	Austria
Scoring by quarter: 19–15, 22–7, 29–8, 31–17
Pts: Nedović 26; Rebs: Blagojević 8 Asts: Nikolić 7		Pts: Friedrich 17; Rebs: Zulic 4 Asts: Vancura 3

La Casilla Arena, Bilbao
Referees: Antonio Conde (ESP), Sergey Mikhaylov (RUS), Andris Aunkrogers (LAT)

24 July 2011
12:45

Report

Croatia	63–81	Serbia
Scoring by quarter: 10–23, 20–21, 18–22, 15–15
Pts: Bubalo 19; Rebs: Babić 6 Asts: Batur 3		Pts: Nedović 15; Rebs: Anđušić 6 Asts: Jaramaz 5

La Casilla Arena, Bilbao
Referees: Miguel Perez Perez (ESP), Sergiy Chebyshev (UKR), Nikolaos Somos (GRE)

24 July 2011
15:00

Report

Lithuania	78–62	Austria
Scoring by quarter: 28–11, 16–20, 16–14, 18–17
Pts: Staniulis 17; Rebs: Staniulis 18; Asts: Dambrauskas 5		Pts: Maresch 18; Rebs: Klepeisz 6 Asts: Radoš 3

La Casilla Arena, Bilbao
Referees: Oscar Lefwerth (SWE), Regis Bardera (FRA), Sašo Petek (SLO)

== Knockout round ==
=== Championship ===
Quarter-finals
July 22 – Bilbao
France	68
Germany	59
July 22 – Bilbao
Italy	78
Montenegro	67
July 22 – Bilbao
Spain	77
Latvia	70
July 22 – Bilbao
Russia	64
Turkey	57

Semi-finals
July 23 – Bilbao
France	66
Italy	77
July 23 – Bilbao
Spain	87
Russia	60

Final
July 24 – Bilbao
Italy	70
Spain	82
Third place
July 24 – Bilbao
France	66
Russia	50

==== Quarterfinals ====
22 July 2011
14:00

Report

France	68–59	Germany
Scoring by quarter: 16–13, 16–10, 20–16, 16–20
Pts: Westermann 19; Rebs: Yeguete 6 Asts: Fournier 3		Pts: Kramer 16; Rebs: Barthel 6 Asts: Wendt 4

Bilbao Arena, Bilbao
Referees: Aleksandar Glišić (SRB), Jurgis Laurinavicius (LTU), Zoran Mitrovski (MKD)

22 July 2011
16:15

Report

Italy	78–67	Montenegro
Scoring by quarter: 25–6, 14–23, 11–18, 28–20
Pts: Gentile 27; Rebs: Melli 11; Asts: De Nicolao 5		Pts: Dubljević 17; Rebs: Dubljević 12; Asts: Spasojević 3

Bilbao Arena, Bilbao
Referees: Antonio Conde (ESP), Sreten Radović (CRO), Sašo Petek (SLO)

22 July 2011
18:30

Report

Russia	64–57	Turkey
Scoring by quarter: 10–13, 13–21, 20–7, 21–16
Pts: Korshakov 15; Rebs: Korshakov 10; Asts: Strebkov, Maxim Tkachenko 4		Pts: Aldemir 13; Rebs: Aldemir 23; Asts: Köksal 4

Bilbao Arena, Bilbao
Referees: Sreten Radović (CRO), Igor Dragojević (MNE), Andris Aunkrogers (LAT)

22 July 2011
20:45

Report

Spain	77–70	Latvia
Scoring by quarter: 27–21, 8–20, 24–18, 18–11
Pts: Sastre 27; Rebs: Mirotić 13; Asts: Pozas 6		Pts: Antrops 15; Rebs: Mejeris 9 Asts: Lejasmeiers 6

Bilbao Arena, Bilbao
Referees: Luigi Lamonica (ITA), Sergey Mikhaylov (RUS), Gentian Cici (ALB)

==== Semifinals ====
23 July 2011
18:00

Report

France	66–77	Italy
Scoring by quarter: 20–23, 17–19, 19–15, 10–20
Pts: Fournier 19; Rebs: Lauvergne, Yeguete; Asts: Fournier 4		Pts: Gentile 21; Rebs: Polonara 6 Asts: Nicolao 4

Bilbao Arena, Bilbao
Referees: Miguel Perez Perez (ESP), Sreten Radović (CRO), Sérgio Silva (POR)

23 July 2011
20:15

Report

Spain	87–60	Russia
Scoring by quarter: 29–17, 15–22, 18–9, 25–12
Pts: Mirotić 37; Rebs: Mirotić 8 Asts: Franch, Sastre 4		Pts: Antipov 10; Rebs: Antipov 6 Asts: Strebkov 5

Bilbao Arena, Bilbao
Referees: Robert Lottermoser (GER), Aleksandar Glišić (SRB), Robert Tanner Cervo (CAN)

==== Bronze-medal game ====
24 July 2011
16:45

Report

France	66–50	Russia
Scoring by quarter: 21–10, 18–11, 11–13, 16–16
Pts: Fournier 20; Rebs: Gobert 6 Asts: Gobert 3		Pts: Balashov 15; Rebs: Antipov 7 Asts: Zubkov 3

Bilbao Arena, Bilbao
Referees: Antonio Conde (ESP), Marcin Kowalski (POL), Gentian Cici (ALB)

==== Final ====
24 July 2011
19:10

Report

Italy	70–82	Spain
Scoring by quarter: 16–17, 19–25, 20–26, 15–14
Pts: Moraschini 17; Rebs: Nicolao 9 Asts: Nicolao 3		Pts: Mirotić 29; Rebs: Mirotić 11; Asts: Franch 9

Bilbao Arena, Bilbao
Attendance: 7 000
Referees: Sreten Radović (CRO), Robert Lottermoser (GER), Igor Dragojević (MNE)

=== 5th–8th playoffs ===
Semi-finals
July 23 – Bilbao
Germany	80
Montenegro	61
July 23 – Bilbao
Latvia	71
Turkey	74

Fifth place
July 24 – Bilbao
Germany	60
Turkey	49
Seventh place
July 24 – Bilbao
Montenegro	85
Latvia	76

==== Semifinals ====
23 July 2011
13:30

Report

Germany	80–61	Montenegro
Scoring by quarter: 22–17, 13–10, 17–17, 28–17
Pts: Mönninghoff 17; Rebs: Barthel, Theis 5 Asts: three players 3		Pts: Dubljević 18; Rebs: Dubljević 10; Asts: Ivanović, Đukanović 3

Bilbao Arena, Bilbao
Referees: Jurgis Laurinavicius (LTU), Sergiy Chebyshev (UKR), Damian James Lyons (AUS)

23 July 2011
15:45

Report

Latvia	71–74	Turkey
Scoring by quarter: 17–17, 9–22, 19–20, 29–12
Pts: Bricis 15; Rebs: Dukulis 5 Asts: Osins, Lejasmeiers 3		Pts: Köksal 25; Rebs: Aldemir 15; Asts: Öngüner 4

Bilbao Arena, Bilbao
Referees: Gentian Cici (ALB), Haris Bijedić (BIH), Sašo Petek (SLO)

==== 7th-place game ====
24 July 2011
17:15

Report

Montenegro	85–76	Latvia
Scoring by quarter: 21–13, 24–13, 22–20, 18–30
Pts: Dubljević 26; Rebs: Dubljević 13; Asts: Đukanović 5		Pts: Bricis 23; Rebs: Meiers 7 Asts: three players 4

La Casilla Arena, Bilbao
Referees: Aleksandar Glišić (SRB), Robert Tanner Cervo (CAN), Damian James Lyons (AUS)

==== 5th-place game ====
24 July 2011
14:15

Report

Germany	60–49	Turkey
Scoring by quarter: 17–11, 10–13, 14–14, 19–11
Pts: Giffey 20; Rebs: Theis 9 Asts: Heckmann, Giffey 5		Pts: Şanlı 18; Rebs: Aldemir 14; Asts: Öngüner, Köksal 3

Bilbao Arena, Bilbao
Referees: Luigi Lamonica (ITA), Haris Bijedić (BIH), Andris Aunkrogers (LAT)

=== 9th–12th playoffs ===
Semi-finals
July 22 – Bilbao
Sweden	73
Greece	66
July 22 – Bilbao
Ukraine	97
Slovenia	79

Ninth place
July 23 – Bilbao
Sweden	79
Ukraine	69
Eleventh place
July 23 – Bilbao
Greece	67
Slovenia	80

==== Semifinals ====
22 July 2011
18:30

Report

Sweden	73–66	Greece
Scoring by quarter: 25–6, 20–20, 18–12, 10–28
Pts: Czerapowicz 23; Rebs: Engström 10; Asts: Lindqvist 4		Pts: Koukoulas 15; Rebs: Koukoulas 7 Asts: Antonakis 3

La Casilla Arena, Bilbao
Referees: Marcin Kowalski (POL), Haris Bijedić (BIH), Nebojša Kovačević (GER)

22 July 2011
20:45

Report

Ukraine	97–79	Slovenia
Scoring by quarter: 28–27, 23–19, 26–19, 20–14
Pts: Lypovyy 21; Rebs: Lypovyy 9 Asts: Lebedintsev 9		Pts: Omić 25; Rebs: Omić 11; Asts: Špan 7

La Casilla Arena, Bilbao
Referees: Sérgio Silva (POR), Nikolaos Somos (GRE), Zafer Yilmaz (TUR)

==== 11th-place game ====
23 July 2011
18:30

Report

Greece	67–80	Slovenia
Scoring by quarter: 9–23, 19–13, 16–18, 23–26
Pts: Psaropoulos 24; Rebs: Antonakis 7 Asts: Psaropoulos, Antonakis 5		Pts: Murić 20; Rebs: Omic 19; Asts: Nikolic 5

La Casilla Arena, Bilbao
Referees: Oscar Lefwerth (SWE), Zoran Mitrovski (MKD), Nebojša Kovačević (GER)

==== 9th-place game ====
23 July 2011
20:45

Report

Sweden	79–69	Ukraine
Scoring by quarter: 23–20, 17–18, 23–15, 16–16
Pts: Gaddefors 19; Rebs: Gaddefors 9 Asts: Engström 4		Pts: Lypovyy 18; Rebs: Lypovyy, Iegorov 6 Asts: Lypovyy 5

La Casilla Arena, Bilbao
Referees: Regis Bardera (FRA), Igor Dragojević (MNE), Zafer Yilmaz (TUR)

== Final standings ==
Rank	Team	Record
Gold medal	Spain	9–0
Silver medal	Italy	6–3
Bronze medal	France	8–1
4th	Russia	5–4
5th	Germany	5–4
6th	Turkey	4–5
7th	Montenegro	5–4
8th	Latvia	2–7
9th	Sweden	4–4
10th	Ukraine	3–5
11th	Slovenia	2–6
12th	Greece	2–6
13th	Serbia	7–2
14th	Lithuania	4–5
15th	Austria	2–7
16th	Croatia	2–7

== Awards ==
2011 Under-20 European champions

Spain
First title

Most Valuable Player
(Spain) Nikola Mirotić

=== All-Tournament Team ===
- (Spain) Nikola Mirotić (MVP)
- (Turkey) Furkan Aldemir
- (Italy) Alessandro Gentile
- (Montenegro) Bojan Dubljević
- (France) Evan Fournier
