= Order of Kantakuzina Katarina Branković =

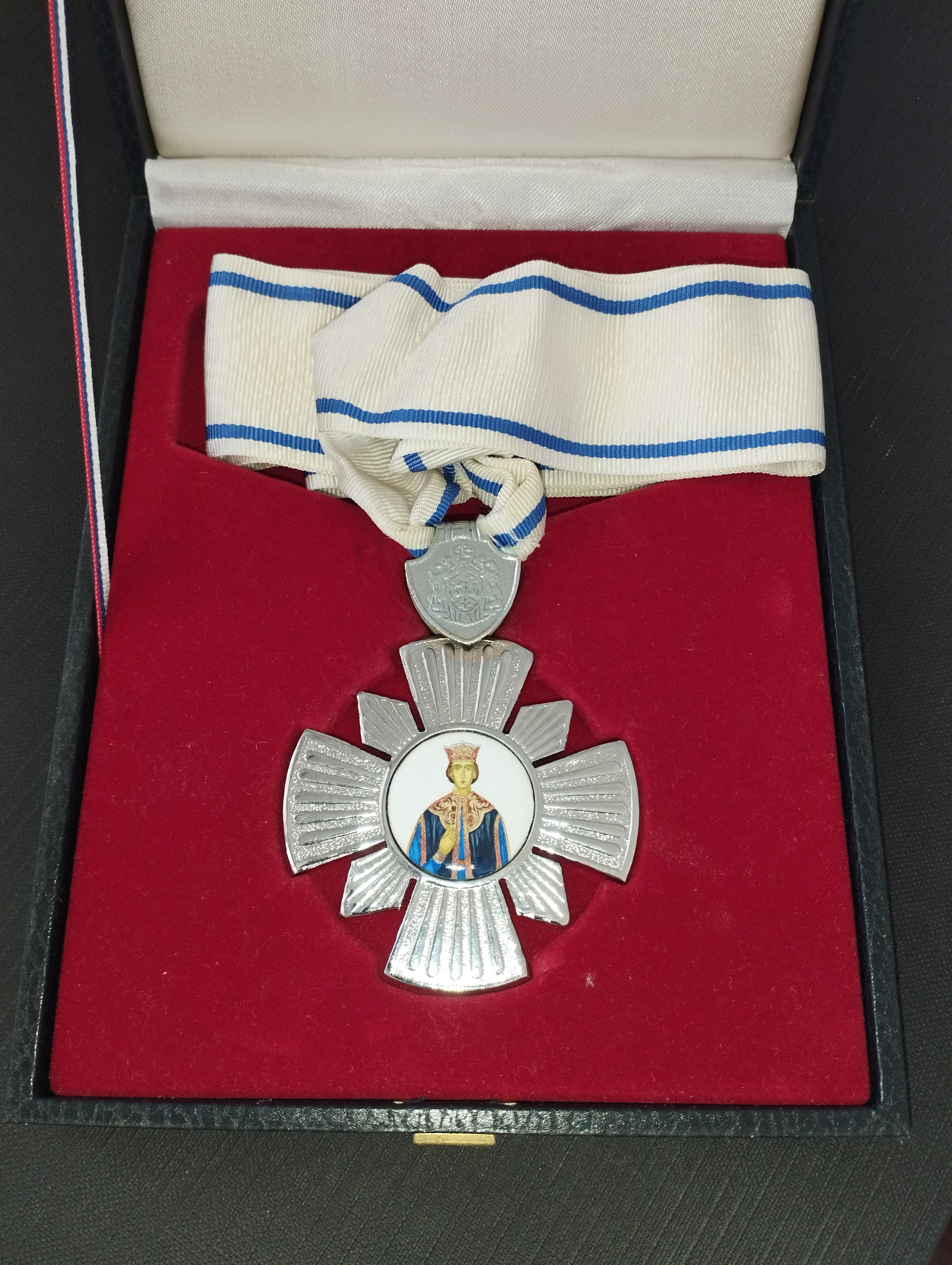
- Awarded for: The award can be awarded to individuals for special benefites for Serbian Orthodox Church in Croatia, Slovenia and Italy according to pronouncement of Metropolit Jovan
- Location: Zagreb
- Country: Croatia
- Presented by: Metropolitanate of Zagreb and Ljubljana
- Ribbon: White with Light Blue stripes on either side
- First award: 2007
- Final award: 2014
- Website: www.mitropolija-zagrebacka.org
The Ribbon of the Order

The Order of Kantakuzina Katarina Branković (Serbian: Орден Кантакузине Катарине Бранковић, Orden Kantakuzine Katarine Branković) is an ecclesiastical honor bestowed by the Metropolitanate of Zagreb and Ljubljana, an eparchy (diocese) within the Serbian Orthodox Church. This order is conferred upon individuals in recognition of their contributions to the Serbian Orthodox Church in the regions encompassing Croatia and Slovenia.

== History ==
Established in 2007, the Order of Kantakuzina Katarina Branković was inaugurated to commemorate the thirtieth anniversary of the enthronement of Metropolitan Jovan Pavlović of Zagreb, the leader of the aforementioned ecclesiastical jurisdiction. The Metropolitanate commissioned the creation of a limited-edition collection of medals and diplomas, crafted at the Monastery of St. Roman located near Niš in southern Serbia. The Order derives its name from the historical figure of Orthodox Countess Kantakuzina Katarina Branković, a prominent resident of Zagreb during the 15th century.

== Description ==
The award consists of a forged medal, diploma and order certificate. The award can be awarded to individuals for special merits according to pronouncement of Metropolit Jovan. The order is divided into Medal of Kantakuzina Katarina Branković of first-order and Medal of Kantakuzina Katarina Branković of second-order.

== Order holders ==
list of holders is not complete

=== First Order ===
- Vasilije, Serbian Orthodox bishop of Srem
- Archbishop Sergei of Samara
- Drazen Juračić, architect)
- Jelena Skorup Juračić, architect)
- Nataša Ćećez Sekulić
- Snežana Opačić
- Mira Bićanić
- Gvido Di Antoni
- Snežana Petrović
- priest Draško Todorović
- priest Dušan Kolundžić
- Dušan Bajatović
- Augustin Bašić

=== Second Order ===
- Abbess Varvara from Tolski monastery in Russia
- Vladimir Aleksandrovič Koveljev sponsor of Tolski monastery in Russia
- Aleksandar Sergejevič Kotov
- Abbot Seraphim Glušakov from Samara
- Abbot Ivan Salnikov from Samara
- 2011 graduation class of the Kantakuzina Katarina Branković Serbian Orthodox Secondary School
- 2010 graduation class of the Kantakuzina Katarina Branković Serbian Orthodox Secondary School
- 2009 graduation class of the Kantakuzina Katarina Branković Serbian Orthodox Secondary School

== See also ==
- Metropolitanate of Zagreb and Ljubljana
- Serbs of Croatia
- List of ecclesiastical decorations
