= Manolis Koukoulas =

Greek basketball player

Manolis Koukoulas Μανώλης Κουκουλάς
No. 4 – Maroussi
- Position: Center
- League: Greek A2 League

Personal information
- Born: August 19, 1991 (age 35) Athens, Greece
- Listed height: 6 ft 10.75 in (2.10 m)
- Listed weight: 242 lb (110 kg)

Career information
- NBA draft: 2013: undrafted
- Playing career: 2009–present

Career history
- 2009–2011: Ilysiakos
- 2012–2014: Kolossos Rodou
- 2014–2015: Panionios
- 2015: Básquet Coruña
- 2015–2016: Aries Trikala
- 2016–2017: Kymis
- 2017–2018: Doukas
- 2018–present: Maroussi

Manolis Koukoulas (alternate spellings: Emmanouil) (Greek: Μανώλης Κουκουλάς; (born August 19, 1991) is a Greek professional basketball player. He is 2.10 m (6 ft 10 3/4 in) tall. He plays at the center position.

== Professional career ==
Some of the clubs that Koukoulas has played with in his pro career include: Ilysiakos, Kolossos Rodou, Panionios, Básquet Coruña and Aries Trikala.

== National team career ==
Koukoulas was a member of the junior national teams of Greece. With Greece's junior national teams, he played at the 2007 FIBA Europe Under-16 Championship, the 2009 FIBA Europe Under-18 Championship, and the 2011 FIBA Europe Under-20 Championship.
