= Katarina Branković =

Countess Consort of Celje

- Countess of Celje
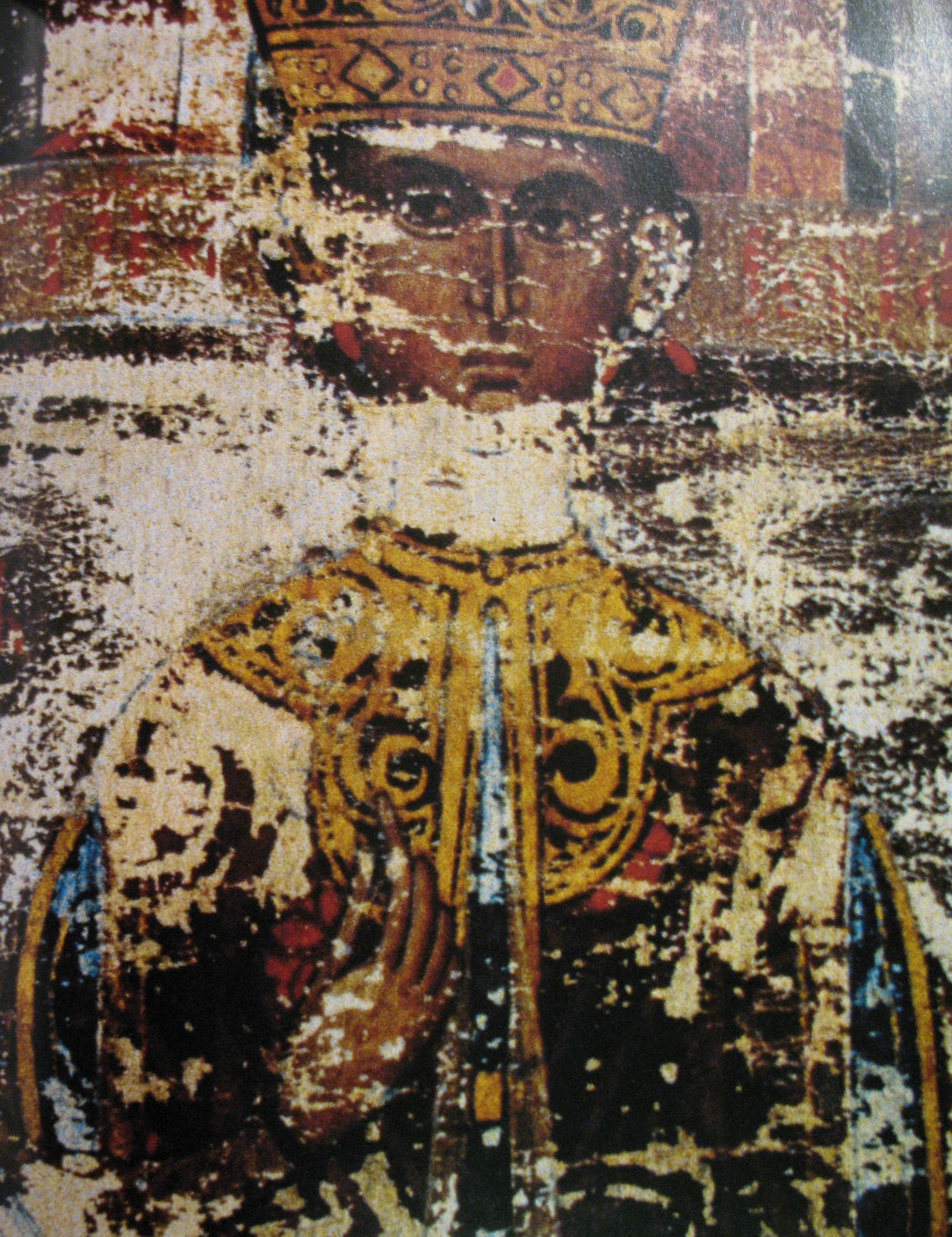
- Portrait from Esphigmenou monastery (1429)
- Holding(s): County of Celje
- Born: 1418; Vučitrn
- Died: 1492 (aged 73–74); Konče
- Noble family: Branković
- Spouse: Ulrich II, Count of Celje (m. 1434; dead 1456)
- Issue: Hermann IV; Elizabeth of Cilli; Catherine; George; Albert
- Father: Đurađ Branković
- Mother: Irene Kantakouzene

Katarina Branković (Serbian Cyrillic: Катарина Бранковић, Greek: Καταρίνα Μπράνκοβιτς; 1418–1492), also known as Kantakuzina (Кантакузина, Kantakouzena) was the Countess of Celje, through the marriage with Count of Celje Ulrich II. A Serbian princess, she was the daughter of Despot Đurađ Branković and Byzantine princess Irene Kantakouzene. She is remembered for writing the Varaždin Apostol (1454), and her endowment of the Rmanj Monastery.

== Biography ==
Katarina married Ulrich II, Count of Celje (1406–1456) on 20 of April 1434. This was a political marriage with intent to ensure western support to Serbian Despotate. Her sister Mara Branković was married to Sultan Murad II to ensure support from the east. Kantakuzina Katarina Branković gave birth to five children, Hermann (1439–1452), George (1444–1445), Albert (†1448) and the twin daughters Elisabeth (1441–1455) and Catherine (1441-1441). Pope Pius II once said that Kantakuzina was beautiful and fair (lat. alioquin facie et moribus honestam). In 1453 or 1454 she entrusted the creation of Varaždin Apostol, hand-written Orthodox liturgical book and oldest preserved text in Cyrillic from the territory of today's Croatia, to a group of three transcribers.

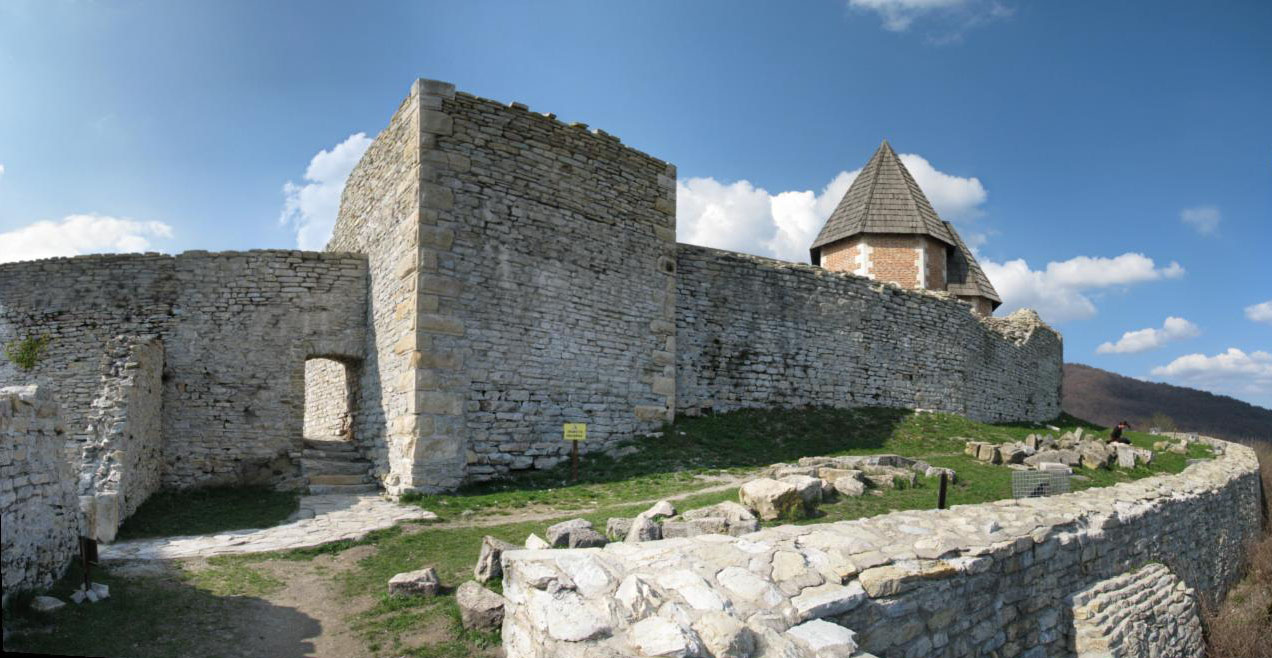
Medvedgrad was one of Katarina's possessions

After Ulrich II was killed in the Siege of Belgrade in 1456, Katarina gave up all of her possessions in modern-day Croatia and Slovenia except of Krško in exchange for yearly allowances of 2,000 Ducats, and in 1460 she sold all of her possessions in Slavonia to Holy Roman Emperor Frederick III for 29,000 Goldguldens. She decided to start traveling across Italy, Corfu, Dubrovnik and in the end came back to Old Serbia (modern-day North Macedonia) to visit her sister Mara Branković that was widow of Ottoman Sultan Murad II. Together with her sister she helped in the conclusion of Treaty of Constantinople after the Ottoman–Venetian War. To that end, she was sending her delegates to Venice between 1470 and 1472, and along with her sister she led the Venetian envoys to Istanbul. After the death of her sister Mara in 1487 Katarina took the care about Mount Athos monasteries. Prior to her death Katarina relinquish her possession of Krško and right on yearly allowances. She died in 1492 in village Konče where she was buried in local church of Saint Stephen.

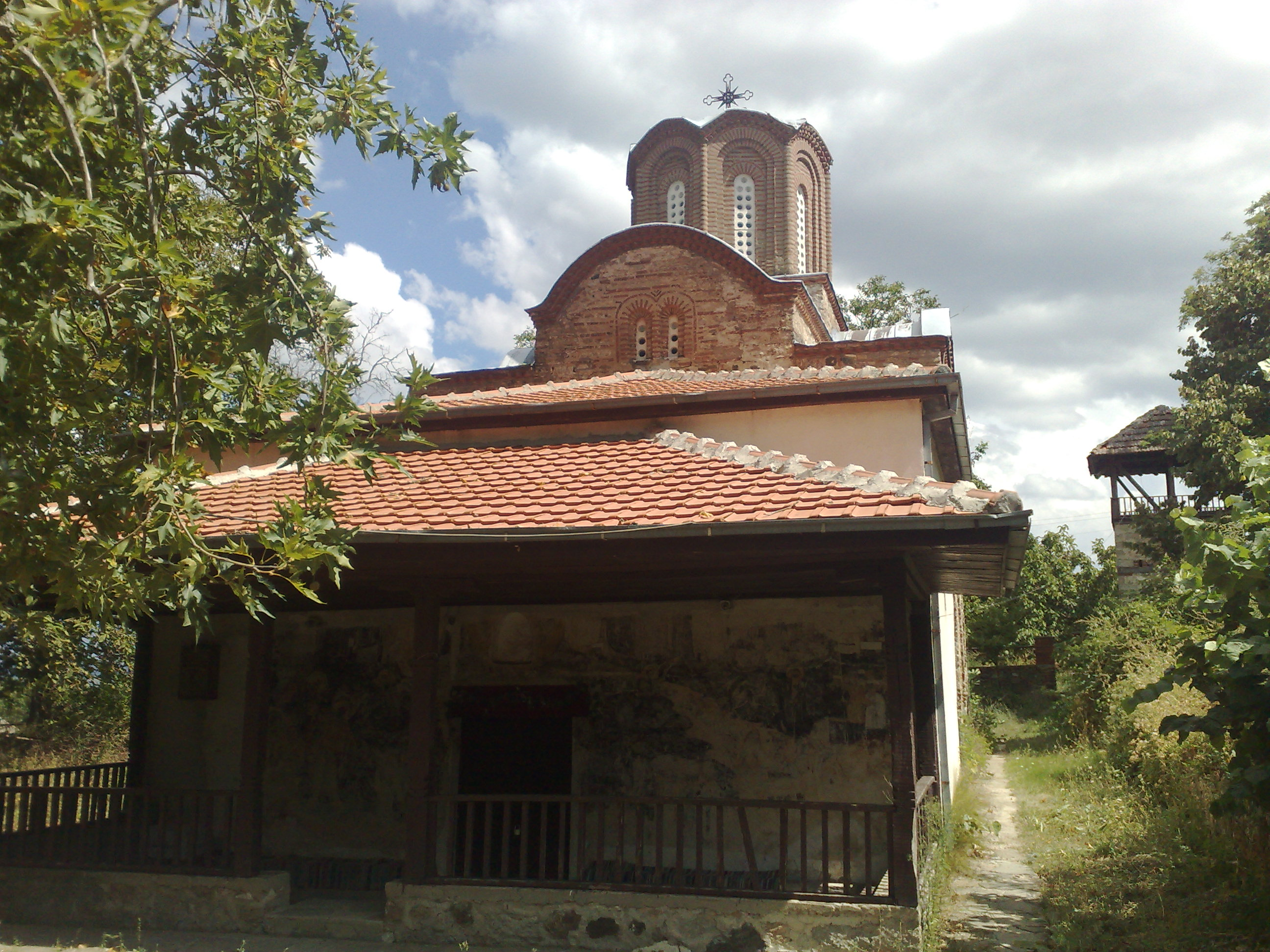
Church of Saint Stephen in Konče, North Macedonia

== Endowments ==
- Rmanj Monastery in Martin Brod, dedicated to St. Nicolas Mirlikijski. The monastery got its name in honor of Hermann IV, Katarina's early deceased son.

== Legacy ==
Kantakuzina Katarina Branković Serbian Orthodox Secondary School in Zagreb is a coeducational gymnasium of Serbian Orthodox Church that bears Katarina's name. Metropolitanate of Zagreb and Ljubljana was also awarding Order of Kantakuzina Katarina Branković.

The character of Katarina Branković is portrayed by Eva Dedova in the Netflix original historical docudrama Rise of Empires: Ottoman (2020).

== Ancestry ==
Ancestors of Katarina Branković

16. Mladen
8. Branko Mladenović
4. Vuk Branković
2. Djuradj Branković
20. Pribac Hrebeljanović
10. Lazar Hrebeljanović
5. Mara Lazarević
22. Vratko Nemanjić
11. Milica Nemanjić
1. Katarina Branković
24. John VI Kantakouzenos
12. Matthew Kantakouzenos
25. Irene Asanina
6. Theodore Kantakouzenos
26. Demetrios Palaiologos
13. Irene Palaiologina
27. Theodora Komnene?
3. Irene Kantakouzene
28. Simeon Uroš
14. John Uroš
29. Thomais Orsini
7. Helena Ouresina Doukina
30. Radoslav Hlapen
15. Unnamed daughter of Radoslav Hlapen
31. Irene?

== See also ==
- Varaždin Apostol
- Kassia
- Anna Komnene
- Jefimija
- Princess Milica of Serbia
- Maria Angelina Doukaina Palaiologina
- Jelena Balšić
- Saint Helen of Serbia
- Angelina of Serbia
- Mara Branković
- Olivera Despina
- Simonida
