= Göksenin Köksal =

Turkish basketball player (born 1991)

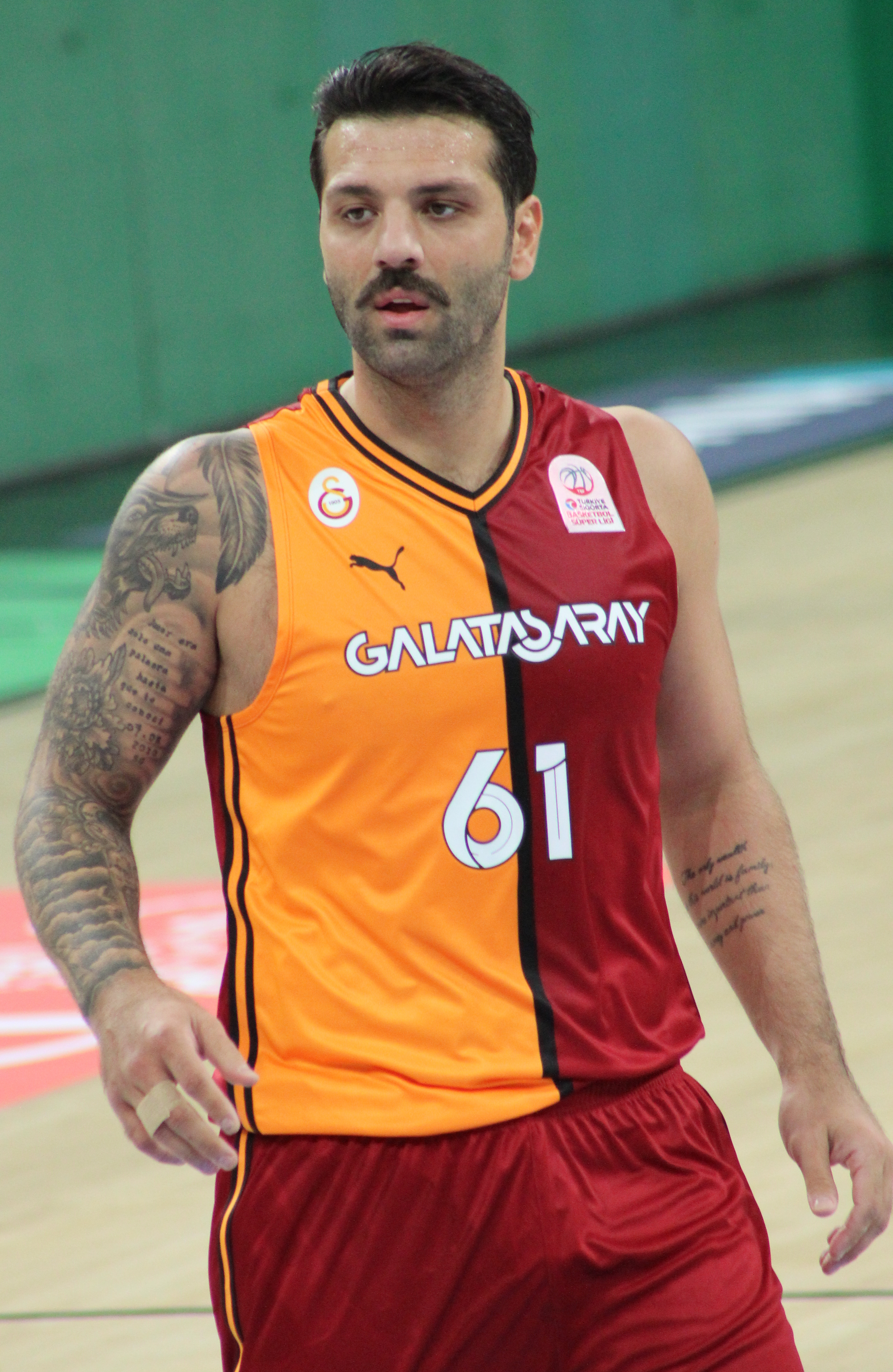
- Göksenin with Galatasaray

Free Agent
- Position: Shooting guard / small forward

Personal information
- Born: 8 January 1991 (age 35) Tonya, Trabzon, Turkey
- Listed height: 6 ft 4.75 in (1.95 m)
- Listed weight: 206 lb (93 kg)

Career information
- NBA draft: 2013: undrafted
- Playing career: 2010–present

Career history
- 2010–2025: Galatasaray
- 2014–2015: →Darüşşafaka
- 2025–2026: Bursaspor

Career highlights
- Turkish Supercup winner (2011); Turkish Super League champion (2013); EuroCup champion (2016)

Hüseyin Göksenin Köksal (born 8 January 1991) is a Turkish professional basketball player who last played for Bursaspor Basketbol of the Basketbol Süper Ligi (BSL). He is a 1.95 m (6'4¾") tall swingman.

== Professional career ==
=== Galatasaray ===
Köksal began his pro career in 2010, with the Turkish club Galatasaray. With Galatasaray, he won the Turkish President's Cup (Turkish Supercup) in 2011, and the Turkish Super League championship of the 2012–13 season.

==== Loan to Darüşşafaka ====
He then moved to the Turkish club Darüşşafaka, on loan from Galatasaray, for the 2014–15 season.

=== Return to Galatasaray ===
He returned to Galatasaray for the 2015–16 season. With Galatasaray, he won the EuroCup 2015–16 season's championship. Köksal re-signed with the team on 10 August 2021.

It was announced that he parted ways with Galatasaray, for which he played for 15 years and was the team captain for 9 years, on June 13, 2025.

=== Bursaspor ===
On July 24, 2025, he signed with Bursaspor Basketbol of the Basketbol Süper Ligi (BSL).

== Turkish national team ==
Köksal was a regular member of the junior national teams of Turkey. With Turkey's junior national teams, he played at the 2010 FIBA Europe Under-20 Championship and the 2011 FIBA Europe Under-20 Championship. He has also been a member of the senior men's Turkish national basketball team. With Turkey's senior team, he played at the EuroBasket 2015.
