= Theresianum Gymnasium Mainz =

Private all-day secondary and high school in Mainz, Germany

- Theresianum
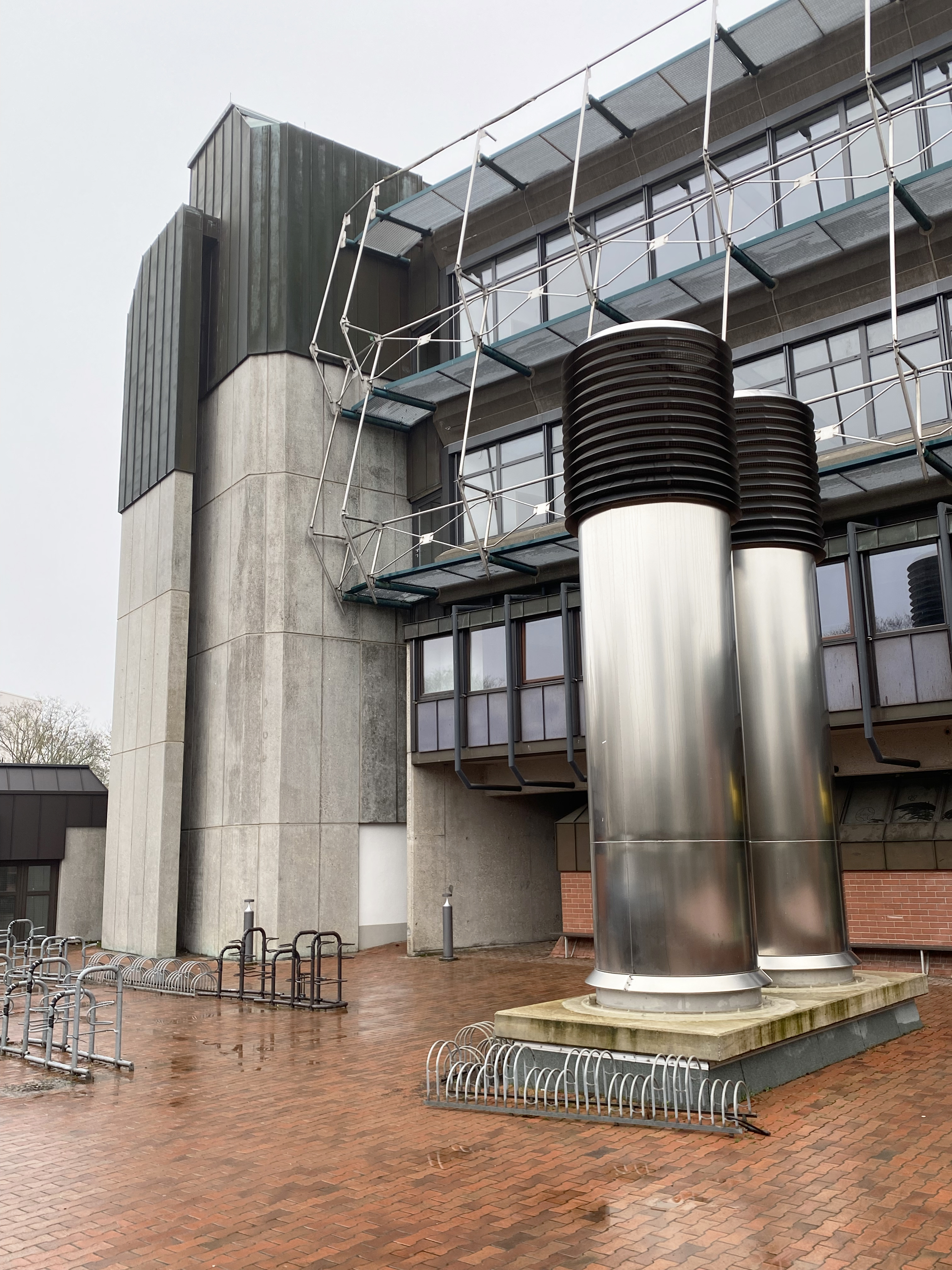

Location
- Oberer Laubenheimer Weg 58 55131 Mainz; Germany
- Coordinates: 49.9836°N 8.2848°E

Information
- Established: 1927
- Principal: Stefan Caspari
- Website: www.theresianum-mainz.de

Theresianum Gymnasium (for short: Theresianum or TH) is a private all-day secondary and high school located in Mainz, Germany. It was founded in 1927 by the Johannesbund e.V. The high school is a Catholic school and is part of Schulgesellschaft Sankt Martinus. This does not mean that the school does not accept students with a different religion. Students have the opportunity to achieve the highest academic high school degree, the Abitur after year 12 while they enroll in school for year 5. The school offers a range of extracurricular activities, particularly in athletics, with male and female teams representing the state in student competitions, including an annual student Olympics held in Berlin. The institution has produced several notable alumni, including NBA player Patrick Heckmann.

Theresianum prepares young people for the future with an innovative concept, including modern spaces and equipment for learning.

"Healthy learning needs diversity so children and young people can concentrate better and feel comfortable in a healthy learning environment." (analogously translated from German website) In 2019 the school established cooperation with the Kantakuzina Katarina Branković Serbian Orthodox Secondary School in Zagreb, Croatia in the framework of Erasmus+ programme.
