= Will Yeguete =

French basketball player (born 1991)

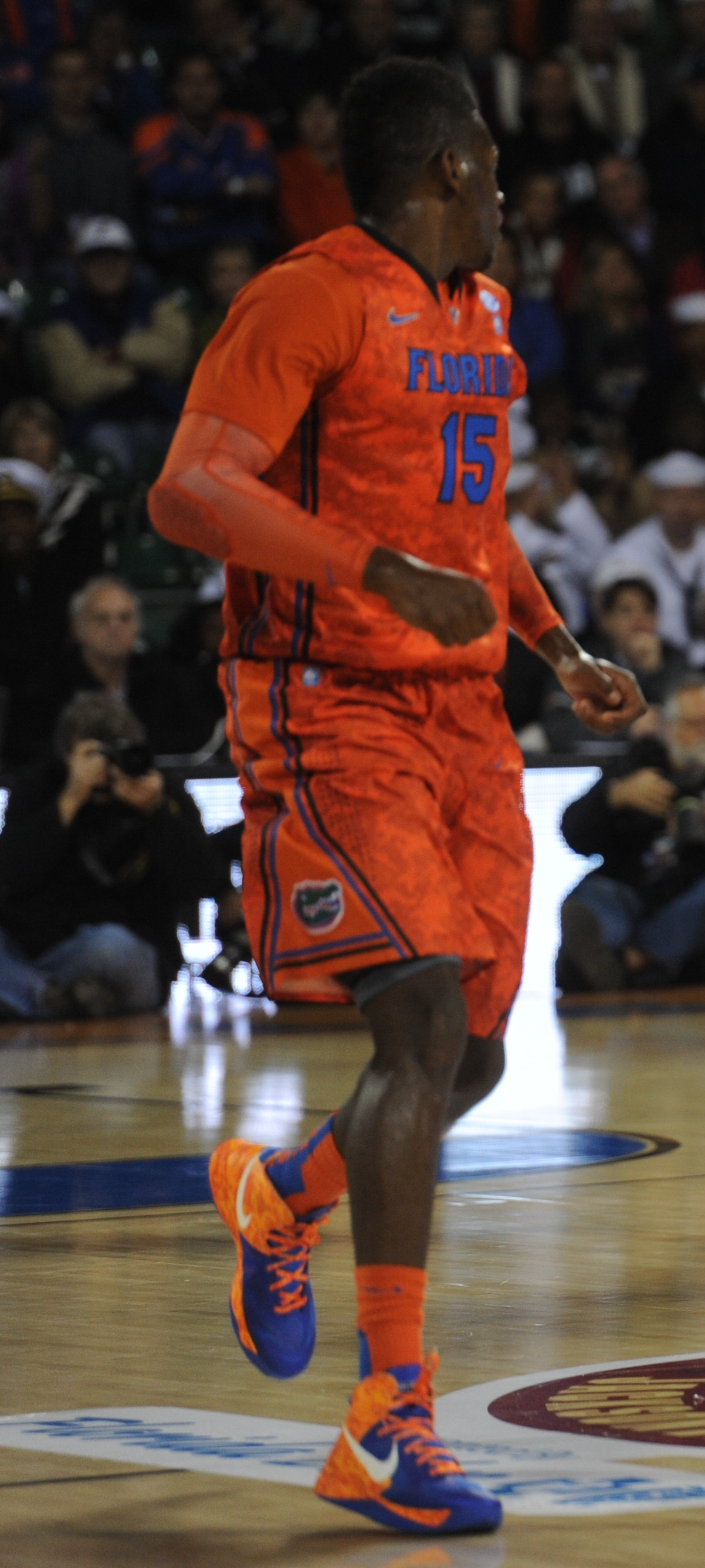
- Yeguete playing for Florida

No. 15 – Le Mans
- Position: Power forward
- League: LNB Élite; EuroCup

Personal information
- Born: October 16, 1991 (age 35) Pessac, France
- Listed height: 6 ft 7 in (2.01 m)
- Listed weight: 222 lb (101 kg)

Career information
- High school: Florida Air Academy (Melbourne, Florida)
- College: Florida (2010–2014)
- NBA draft: 2014: undrafted
- Playing career: 2014–present

Career history
- 2014–2015: STB Le Havre
- 2015–2016: Pau-Orthez
- 2016–2019: Le Mans
- 2019–2022: AS Monaco
- 2022–2023: Limoges CSP
- 2023–present: Le Mans

Career highlights
- French League Cup winner (2025); EuroCup champion (2021); Pro A Most Improved Player (2016); Pro A All-Star (2017); Pro A champion (2018)

Wilfried Yeguete (born October 16, 1991) is a French professional basketball player for Le Mans of the LNB Élite and the EuroCup.

== Collegiate career ==
Yeguete accepted an athletic scholarship to attend the University of Florida in Gainesville, Florida. He played for coach Billy Donovan's Florida Gators men's basketball team from 2010 to 2014. As a Gator, Yeguette was a member of an NCAA Final Four team in 2014, and NCAA Elite Eight teams in 2011, 2012 and 2013.

== International career ==
Yeguete represented France at the 2011 FIBA Europe Under-20 Championship in Bilbao, Spain, helping them win the bronze medal. He played for the same country at the 2015 Summer Universiade, after which France placed fifth. The power forward did not compete with the Central African Republic in the AfroBasket 2015, though.
