= Kantakuzina Katarina Branković Serbian Orthodox Secondary School =

- Srpska pravoslavna opća gimnazija Kantakuzina Katarina Branković (Croatian); Српска православна општа гимназија Кантакузина Катарина Бранковић (Serbian)

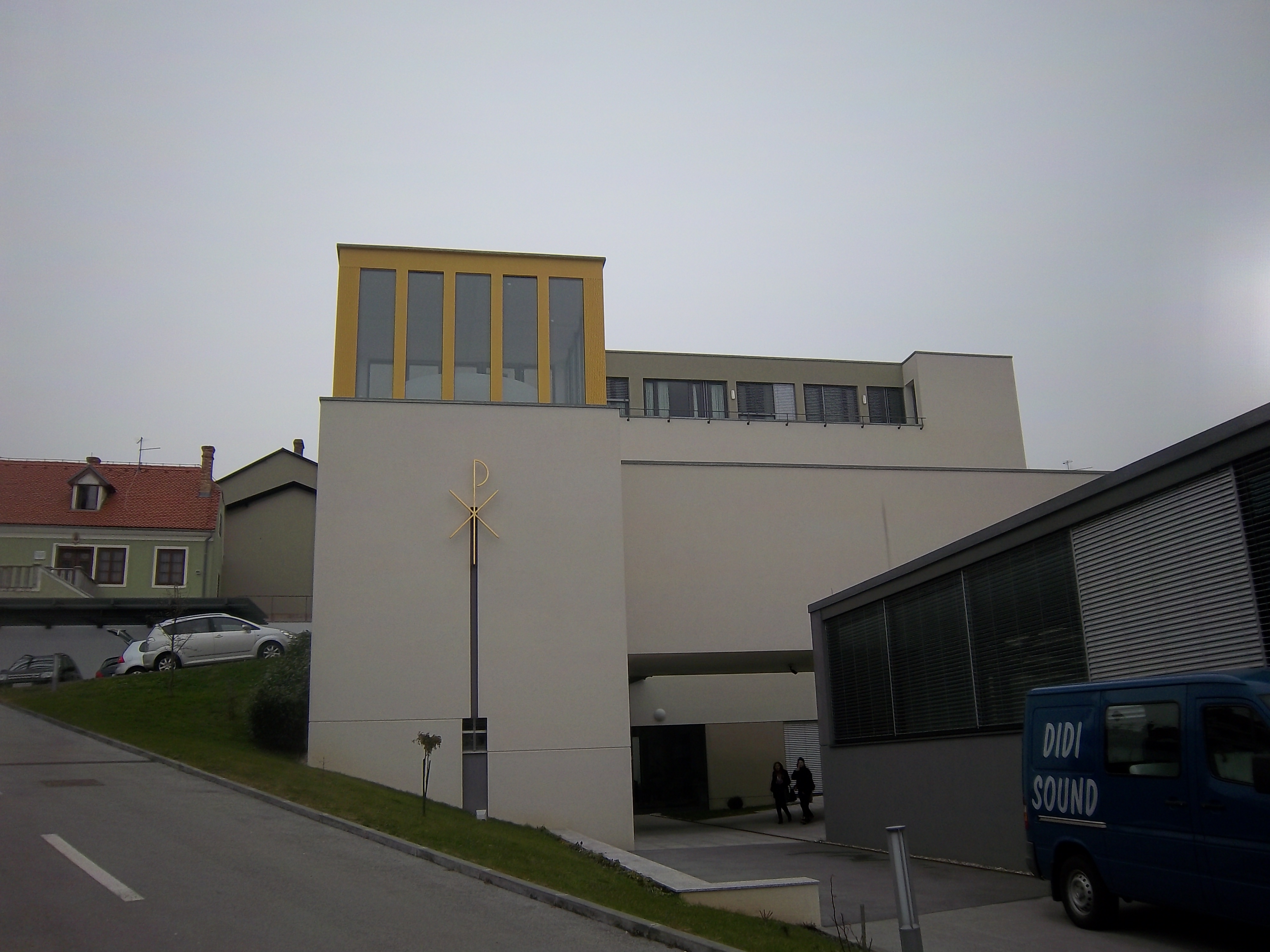

Location
- Sveti Duh 122; Zagreb 10 000; Croatia; 45°49′34″N 15°56′18″E

Information
- Type: Private
- Religious affiliation: Serbian Orthodox Church
- Established: 2005; 21 years ago
- Founder: Serbian Orthodox Church
- Principal: Slobodan Lalić (acting)
- Grades: 9–12
- Gender: Co-ed
- Enrolment: 200
- Language: Croatian, Serbian
- Hours in school day: 8 average (varies; 7–9 45-minute lectures)
- Campus: Urban
- Colours: Red, Blue and White
- Accreditation: Ministry of Science, Education and Sports
- Annual tuition: 0 €
- Song: Hymn to Saint Sava
- Latin name: Orthodoxus Serbiae Secundaria Schola
- Greek name: Σερβικό Ορθόδοξο Γυμνάσιο
- Website: srpskagimnazija-zg.org

The Kantakuzina Katarina Branković Serbian Orthodox Secondary School, (Note: Serbo-Croatian: Srpska pravoslavna opća gimnazija Kantakuzina Katarina Branković, Српска православна општа гимназија Кантакузина Катарина Бранковић) abbreviated as SPOG, is a coeducational gymnasium (analogous to a preparatory high school or grammar school) affiliated with the Metropolitanate of Zagreb and Ljubljana. It is situated in Zagreb, capital city of Croatia, and stands as one of only two non-seminary high schools of the Serbian Orthodox Church.

Established in 2005, the school claims to perpetuate a 200-year tradition of Orthodox minority education in Zagreb. Instruction at the institution is delivered in both Serbian and Croatian.

The curriculum spans four years and encompasses a wide range of subjects, including Serbian, Croatian, English, German, Latin, Church Slavonic, history, geography, politics, economics, music, art history, the Orthodox religion, sociology, psychology, chemistry, physics, biology, mathematics, physical education, ecology, informatics and philosophy. All courses are mandatory for students.

Education at SPOG is provided without tuition cost to students, with additional funding provided by the Serbian Orthodox Church in Croatia covering certain or most of the costs. The student body at the school is diverse, including students from Croatia, Serbia, Bosnia and Herzegovina and other countries. The school maintains an inclusive admission policy, welcoming students regardless of their religion or ethnicity. SPOG is accredited by the Croatian Ministry of Education and is recognized by other countries in the region. Graduates of SPOG pursue further studies in Croatia, Serbia, and abroad. The inaugural graduating class was celebrated at the Monastery of St. Parascheva in Zagreb on June 24, 2009.

== Name ==
The institution derives its name from Kantakuzina Katarina Branković, aristocratic figure and medieval scribe from the XV century. She was the daughter of Đurađ Branković, the Serbian despot, and his wife, Irene Kantakouzene, a member of the Kantakouzenos family of the Byzantine Empire. Kantakuzina Katarina Branković resided for a period in the Zagreb area, where she played a role in fostering the growth and development of the local Orthodox Christian community. Notably, the Varaždin Apostol, hand-written Orthodox liturgical book created in 1454, is associated with her legacy in Zagreb area. It is the oldest preserved text in Cyrillic from the territory of present-day Croatia.

== History ==
Although the modern-day school was established in 2005, the tradition of education organized by the Metropolitanate of Zagreb and Ljubljana dates back to early 1814. At that time, lessons were conducted at the Metropolitanate's headquarters on Ilica Street.

=== Serbian Folk Grammar School ===
In 1888, at the time when the Kingdom of Croatia-Slavonia was a part of the Austro-Hungarian Empire, the Metropolitan initiated the collection of funds for the establishment of a Serbian Folk Grammar School, which was founded in 1891 on Mesnička Street. In 1893, the school was relocated to Margaretska Street where it was visited by Izidor Kršnjavi. During this period, the school run a garden and a library within its walls.

=== Serbian Autonomous Folk School ===
In 1897, the Serbian Folk Grammar School was renamed the Serbian Autonomous Folk School. In 1899, the school celebrated the 50th anniversary of Jovan Jovanović Zmaj's artistic career. The school relocated in 1900 to Petar Preradović Square, close to the Serbian Orthodox Cathedral. The Teachers Council was established in 1906. In 1909, the school moved to a new building in nearby Bogovićeva Street, where the Serbian Orthodox Gymnasium (SPOG) would later be established in 2005. In 1913, the school received a visit from Zagreb Mayor Janko Holjac. The school was discontinued during World War I, reopening afterward as a girls' boarding school in the newly established unified Kingdom of Serbs, Croats, and Slovenes. It retained its name until 1922, when it was converted into a public institution and renamed the State Primary School of King Peter I The Liberator.

=== Contemporary period ===
On 2 October 2003, a meeting was convened at the seat of the Metropolitanate of Zagreb and Ljubljana, where it was decided to reopen the school under the patronage of the Metropolitanate. On 14 January 2004, Metropolitan Jovan Pavlović sent a letter of intent to the Ministry of Science and Education, and on 20 October, a commission met to establish the school. The high school was officially chartered on 21 February 2005. Stories about the school have been featured in various media outlets, including Jutarnji list, Novosti, Politika, Večernji list, Novi list, on Radio Television of Serbia, Radio Televizija Republike Srpske, the website of the President of Croatia, Croatian Radiotelevision and Radio Television of Vojvodina.

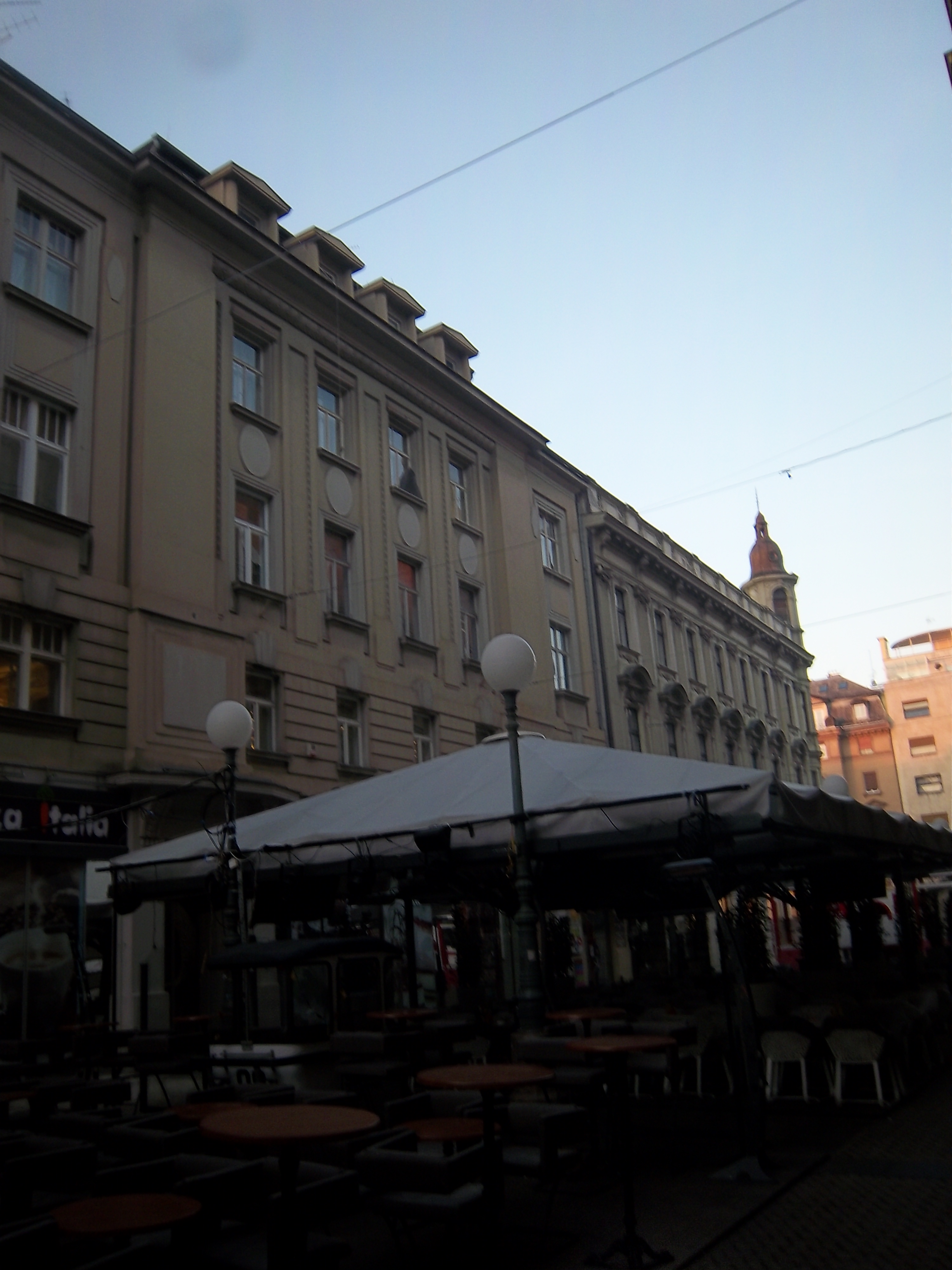
Old building in Bogovićeva Street

For the 2011–12 academic year, the school relocated to a newly constructed 6,000-square-meter campus in northern Zagreb, valued at €7 million. The facility includes a library, computer lab, gymnasium, playground, student counselling offices, cafeteria, music hall, laboratories, chapel, terrace, garden, and quadrangle. Construction of the campus began in May 2010, with the cornerstone ceremony attended by Bishop Nikolaj of the Metropolitanate of Dabar-Bosnia, Bishop of Srem Vasilije, Bishop of Eastern America Mitrophan, and hosted by Metropolitan Jovan.

Deputy Prime Minister of Croatia, Slobodan Uzelac, expressed hope that the school would eventually offer university-level programs, while Mayor of Zagreb Milan Bandić emphasized the importance of the Serbian Orthodox community as an integral part of Zagreb and highlighted the history of Serbian schools in the city. The official opening ceremony in June 2012 was attended by Serbian Patriarch Irinej, along with a delegation from the Holy Synod. During his visit, Patriarch Irinej also met with Croatian President Ivo Josipović and Prime Minister Zoran Milanović. This marked the first official visit by a Serbian Orthodox Patriarch to Croatia since the breakup of Yugoslavia. The event was covered by various media outlets, including Al Jazeera Balkans, Croatian Radiotelevision, Nova TV, Večernji list, Novi list, 24sata, Slobodna Dalmacija, Radio Television of Serbia, B92, Večernje novosti, Blic, Radio Free Europe, Radio and Television of Bosnia and Herzegovina, RTV BN, Kurir, and Prva Srpska Televizija.

The opening ceremony was attended by the Serbian Orthodox Patriarch, Croatian government ministers Željko Jovanović and Predrag Matić, ambassadors from Serbia, the United States, Russia, Norway, France, Canada, and Bosnia and Herzegovina, as well as delegations from Austria, Ukraine, and the Vatican, Serb minority MP Milorad Pupovac representing the Croatian Parliament, Croatian Academy of Sciences and Arts president Zvonko Kusić, mayor Milan Bandić, MPs and representatives of other religious communities. Croatian President Ivo Josipović appeared in a video made for the occasion directed by Dejan Aćimović.

== Curriculum ==
Ninth grade	Tenth grade	Eleventh grade	Twelfth grade
Croatian language	Croatian language	Croatian language	Croatian language
Serbian language	Serbian language	Serbian language	Serbian language
English language	English language	English language	English language
German language	German language	German language	German language
Latin language	Latin language	X	X
Music	Music	Music	Music
Art History	Art History	Art History	Art History
X	Psychology	Psychology	X
X	X	Sociology	X
History	History	History	History
Geography	Geography	Geography	Geography
Mathematics	Mathematics	Mathematics	Mathematics
Physics	Physics	Physics	Physics
Chemistry	Chemistry	Chemistry	Chemistry
Biology	Biology	Biology	Biology
X	Ecology elective	Ecology elective	Ecology elective
Computer science	Computer science elective	Computer science elective	Computer science elective
X	X	X	Politics and Economy
Physical Education	Physical Education	Physical Education	Physical Education
Religious Education	Religious Education	Religious Education	Religious Education
Church Slavonic language optional	Church Slavonic language optional	X	X
X	X	X	Philosophy
X	X	Logic	X

== Extracurricular activities ==
In May 2011 the school has partnered with the local office of the International Rehabilitation Council for Torture Victims to conduct a series of workshops focused on psychological issues for first-grade students. In December 2011 the school held a conference for Serbian language teachers in partnership with the Council of Serbian Language Teachers from Vukovar-Syrmia County and Osijek-Baranja County.

From September 10 to 18, 2019, students participated in the Erasmus+ student exchange project "Multi-kulti folder" involving 12 students from the school and 12 peers from Theresianum Gymnasium Mainz, Germany.

As a part of their extracurricular activities students created a version of a free sanitary pad dispenser to assist their female classmates. Inspired by a sociology class discussion, the students reached out to the manufacturer Violeta for donations and constructed two dispensers installed in the girls' restrooms, highlighting the importance of accessible hygiene products for all women.

The school has hosted several high level visitors over the years. On January 28, 2019, Serbian Minister of Culture Vladan Vukosavljević visited the school where he discussed the school's programs, funding, and the living conditions of Orthodox Serbs in Croatia. On March 16, 2023, Željka Cvijanović, the Chairperson of the Presidency of Bosnia and Herzegovina, visited the school accompanied by the Bosnian ambassador to Croatia, Aleksandar Vranješ. During her visit, she met with school officials and students from the Republika Srpska. On March 29, 2023, Croatian Prime Minister Andrej Plenković visited the school to attend a screening of the documentary film “Kralj” by Dejan Aćimović. On September 23, 2024, U.S. Ambassador to Croatia Nathalie Rayes gave a lecture titled "Through the Ups and Downs of Life" to third and fourth-grade students.

== See also ==
- Education in Croatia
- Metropolitanate of Zagreb and Ljubljana
- Serbs of Zagreb

== Sources ==
- Mirko Savković (2022). "Percepcija Srpske pravoslavne opšte gimnazije "Kantakuzina Katarina Branković" u medijima" [The media perceptions on Kantakuzina Katarina Branković Serb Orthodox Secondary School]. Tragovi: Journal for Serbian and Croatian Topics. 5 (2). Serb National Council & Archive of Serbs in Croatia: 152–171.
