= Boris Barać =

Croatian basketball player

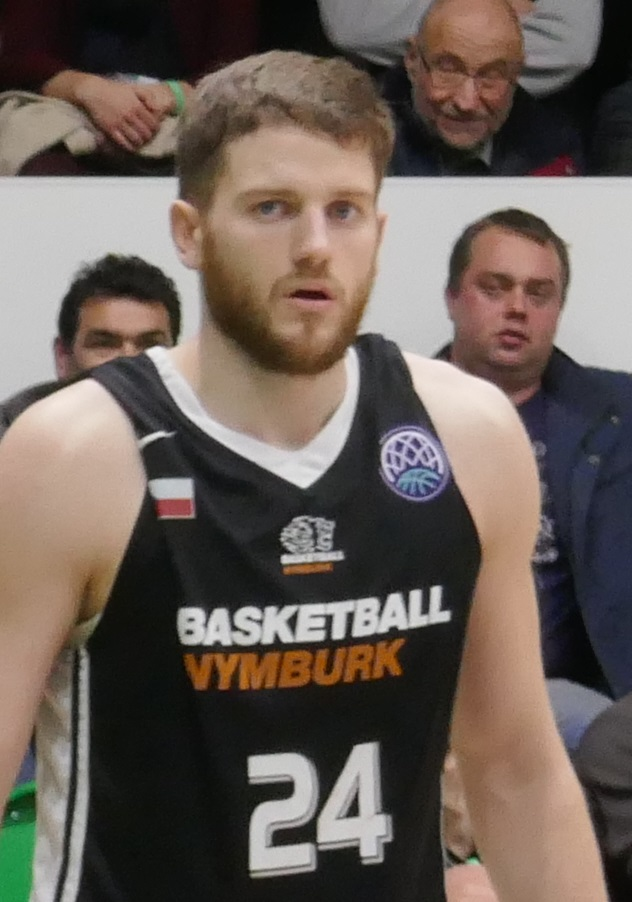

Personal information
- Born: February 21, 1992 (age 34) Mostar, Bosnia and Herzegovina, Yugoslavia
- Listed height: 2.06 m (6 ft 9 in)
- Listed weight: 105 kg (231 lb)

Career information
- Playing career: 2010–present
- Position: Power forward
- Number: 24

Career history
- 2010–2014: Široki
- 2014: Cibona
- 2014–2017: Zadar
- 2017–2018: Nymburk
- 2018–2019: Porto
- 2019–2020: Iberojet Palma
- 2020–2024: Falco KC Szombathely

Career highlights
- 3× Bosnian League champion (2010–2012); Czech League champion (2018); 4× Hungarian League champion (2021–2024); 3× Bosnian Cup winner (2011, 2012, 2014); Czech Cup winner (2018); Portuguese Cup winner (2019); 2× Hungarian Cup winner (2021, 2023)

Boris Barać (born 21 February 1992) is a Croatian professional basketball player for Falco KC Szombathely of the Hungarian first division. Standing at 2.06 m, he plays at the power forward position. His older brother Stanko Barać was also a professional basketball player. He grew up at HKK Široki, and signed a three-year contract with Zadar in 2014.
