= Mitja Nikolić =

Slovenian basketball player

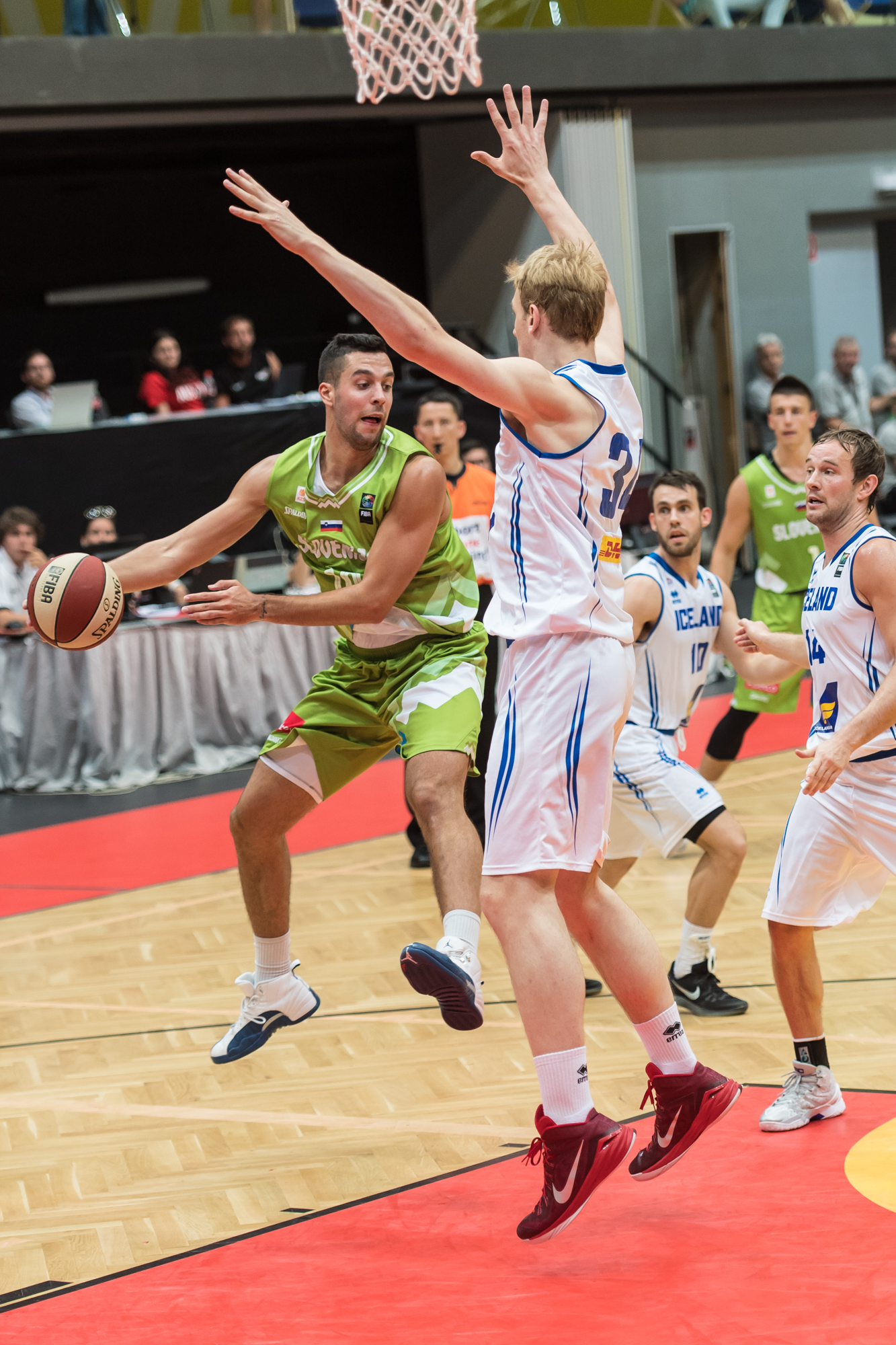

Basket Ravenna Piero Manett
- Position: Small forward / power forward

Personal information
- Born: 24 February 1991 (age 35) Postojna, SR Slovenia, SFR Yugoslavia
- Listed height: 2.00 m (6 ft 7 in)
- Listed weight: 97 kg (214 lb)

Career information
- NBA draft: 2013: undrafted
- Playing career: 2008–present

Career history
- 2006–2007: Geoplin Slovan
- 2007–2008: Union Olimpija
- 2008–2009: Geoplin Slovan
- 2009–2013: Zlatorog Laško
- 2013–2014: Rogaška
- 2014–2015: USK Praha
- 2015–2016: Union Olimpija
- 2016–2017: Fortitudo Bologna
- 2017: Novipiù Casale Monferrato
- 2017–2018: Rogaška
- 2018: Helios Suns
- 2018–2019: Remer Treviglio
- 2020: Roseto Sharks
- 2020–2021: Remer Treviglio
- 2021: Scaligera Basket Verona
- 2021–2022: Urania Milano
- 2022–2023: Derthona Basket
- 2023–present: Ravenna

Mitja Nikolić Smrdelj (born 24 February 1991) is a Slovenian professional basketball player for Basket Ravenna Piero Manetti. He also represented the Slovenian national basketball team between 2014 and 2017.

He is 2.00 m tall and plays the position small forward.

Nikolić spent the 2020-21 season with Remer Treviglio of the Serie A2. He averaged 13.4 points, 5.0 rebounds, and 3.4 assists per game. On September 24, 2021, Nikolić signed with Scaligera Basket Verona.

Nikolić signed in summer 2022 with Serie A team Derthona Basket. He didn't break to first team - played 5 games, scored nothing and had 6 rebound, 3 assists, 1 steal.

== Personal life/Family ==
Nikolić's father was a basketball player who played for KD-Postojna, a professional Slovenian team located in the city of Postojna. His father was also an assistant coach of the Slovenian national basketball team from 2004 to 2006. His younger brother, Aleksej Nikolić, plays for KK Partizan.

== International career ==
He represented Slovenia at the 2015 EuroBasket where they were eliminated by Latvia in eighth finals.
