= Milutin Đukanović =

Montenegrin basketball player

BK Olomoucko
- Position: Shooting guard
- League: National Basketball League

Personal information
- Born: 20 July 1991 (age 35) Cetinje, Montenegro, SFR Yugoslavia
- Listed height: 1.88 m (6 ft 2 in)
- Listed weight: 85 kg (187 lb)

Career information
- NBA draft: 2013: undrafted
- Playing career: 2011–present

Career history
- 2011–2012: Budućnost
- 2012–2013: HKK Zrinjski
- 2013–2014: BK Opava
- 2014–2015: Lovćen
- 2015: Türk Telekom
- 2015–2016: Lovćen
- 2016: Metalac
- 2016–2017: KTE-Duna Aszfalt
- 2017–2018: Spars Sarajevo
- 2018–2021: Lovćen 1947
- 2021–present: BK Olomoucko

Milutin Đukanović (born 20 July 1991) is a Montenegrin professional basketball player for BK Olomoucko of the Czech National Basketball League.

Đukanović played for Budućnost, HKK Zrinjski, BK Opava, Lovćen Cetinje, Türk Telekom, KK Metalac Valjevo, KTE-Duna Aszfalt and Spars Sarajevo. He played for Lovćen 1947 of the Montenegrin Basketball League and the Adriatic Second League from 2018 to 2021. Đukanović signed with BK Olomoucko on 2 December 2021.
