= Dmitry Korshakov =

Russian basketball player

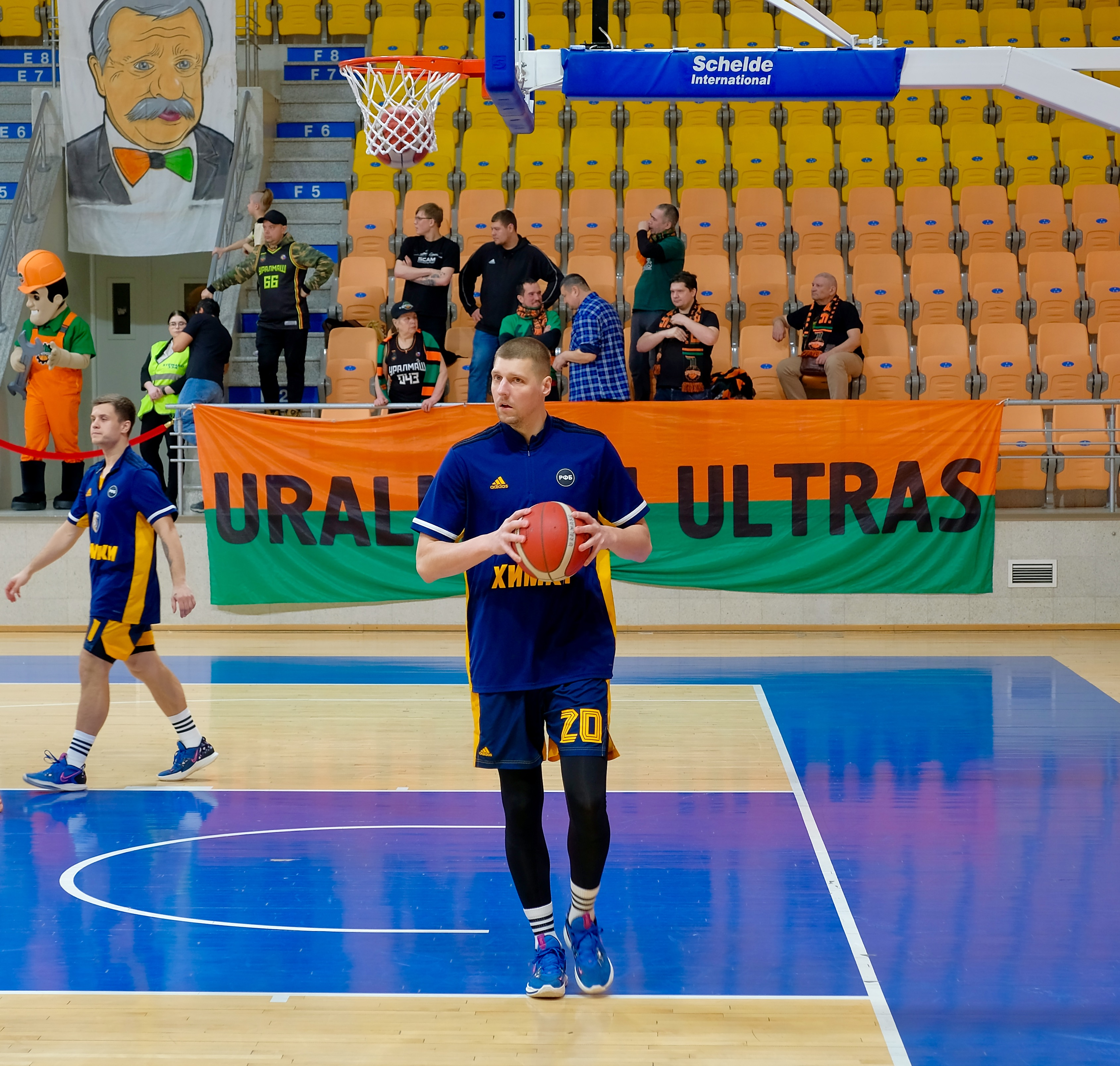

No. 20 – MBA Moscow
- Position: Power forward / small forward
- League: Russian Basketball Super League 1

Personal information
- Born: March 21, 1991 (age 35) Moscow, Soviet Union
- Listed height: 6 ft 7 in (2.01 m)
- Listed weight: 216 lb (98 kg)

Career information
- NBA draft: 2013: undrafted
- Playing career: 2012–present

Career history
- 2012–2013: CSKA Moscow
- 2013–2016: Krasny Oktyabr
- 2017–present: MBA Moscow

Dmitry Aleksandrovich Korshakov (Russian: Дмитрий Александрович Коршаков, born March 21, 1991) is a Russian professional basketball player who currently plays for MBA Moscow of the Russian Basketball Super League 1. Standing at 2.01 m (6 ft 7 in), he plays the power forward and small forward positions.
