= Nemanja Jaramaz =

Serbian basketball player

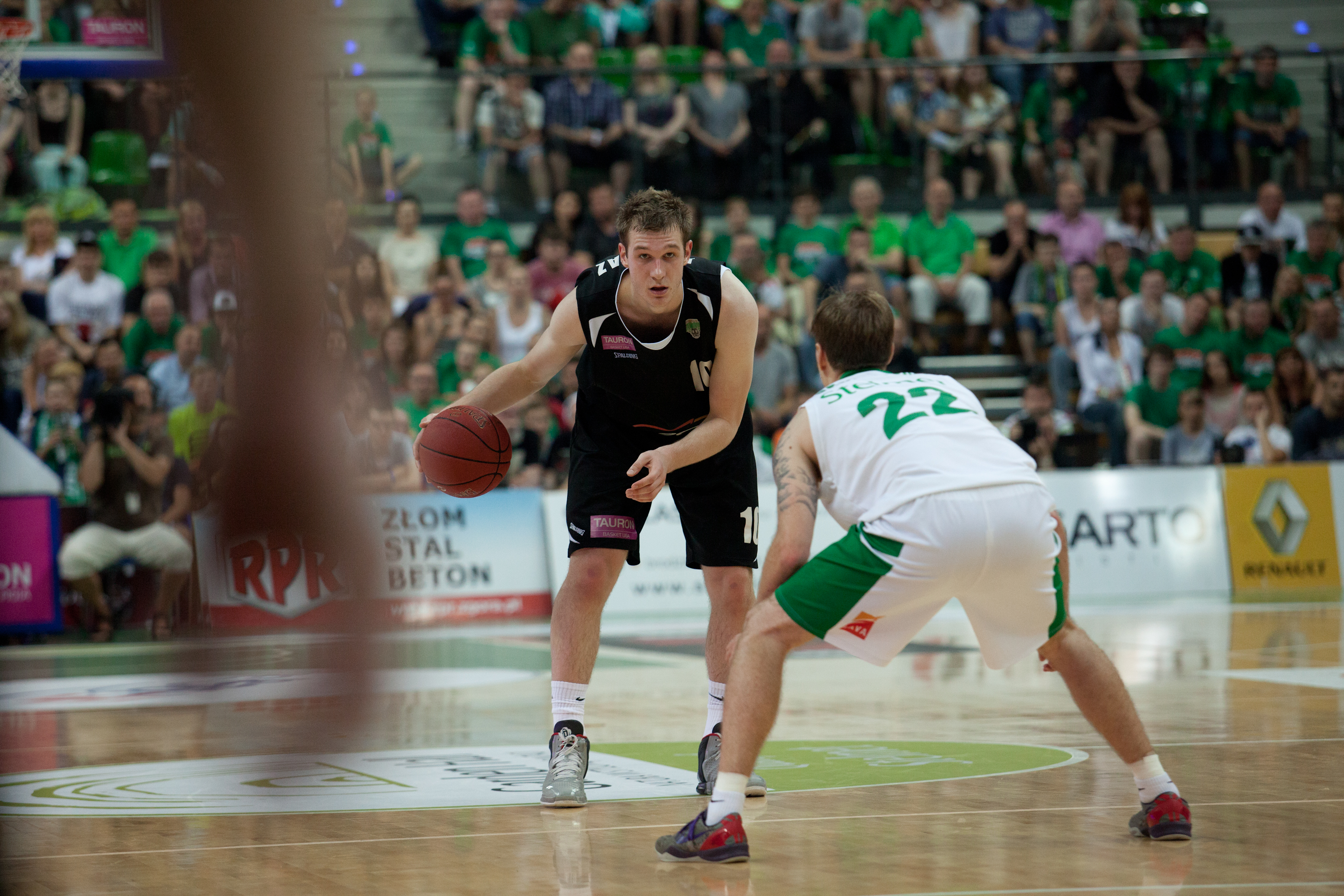
- Jaramaz with Turów Zgorzelec in June 2014.

No. 11 – KK Dynamic
- Position: Shooting guard
- League: Basketball League of Serbia

Personal information
- Born: July 10, 1991 (age 35) Nikšić, Montenegro, Yugoslavia
- Listed height: 2.01 m (6 ft 7 in)
- Listed weight: 86 kg (190 lb)

Career information
- NBA draft: 2013: undrafted
- Playing career: 2009–present

Career history
- 2009–2010: Mega Vizura
- 2010–2012: Partizan
- 2012: → Mega Vizura
- 2012–2013: Angelico Biella
- 2013: Astana
- 2013–2015: Turów Zgorzelec
- 2015–2016: Budućnost Podgorica
- 2016: ICL Manresa
- 2016–2017: Anwil Włocławek
- 2017: Oettinger Rockets
- 2017–2018: Löwen Braunschweig
- 2018–2019: Stal Ostrów Wielkopolski
- 2019–2020: FMP
- 2020–2022: Kecskeméti TE
- 2022–present: KK Dynamic

Career highlights
- ABA League champion (2011); Serbian League champion (2011); Serbian Cup winner (2011); Polish League champion (2014); Montenegrin Cup winner (2016); All-PLK Team (2017)
Medals
Men's basketball
Representing Serbia
U18 European Championship
Gold medal – first place	2009 France	Team
U16 European Championship
Gold medal – first place	2007 Greece	Team

Nemanja Jaramaz (Serbian Cyrillic: Немања Јарамаз; born July 10, 1991) is a Serbian professional basketball player for KK Dynamic Belgrade of the Basketball League of Serbia. Standing at 2.01 m (6 ft 7 in), he plays at the shooting guard position.

== Professional career ==
In 2006, Jaramaz joined the KK Partizan junior team. He was loaned to Mega Vizura for the 2009–10 season. In 2010 he returned to Partizan and begin to play for the senior team. In March 2012, he was loaned again to Mega Vizura for the remainder of the season.

In June 2012, Jaramaz signed a one-year deal with the Italian team Angelico Biella. In January 2013, he was released by the Biella. Later that month he moved to Kazakhstan and signed with BC Astana for the remainder of the season.

In July 2013, Jaramaz signed a one-year deal with the Polish team Turów Zgorzelec. With them he won the Polish League in the 2013–14 season. In July 2014, he re-signed with Turow for one more season.

On September 14, 2015, Jaramaz signed with Budućnost Podgorica. In April 2016, he left Budućnost and signed with the Spanish club ICL Manresa for the rest of the 2015–16 ACB season.

On November 3, 2016, Jaramaz signed with Polish club Anwil Włocławek for the rest of the 2016–17 PLK season.

On September 19, 2017, Jaramaz signed a two-month contract with German club Oettinger Rockets. Following the expiration of his contract, he parted ways with Oettinger on November 28, 2017. Two days later, he signed with Basketball Löwen Braunschweig for the rest of the 2017–18 BBL season.

On July 22, 2020, Jaramaz signed a two-year contract with FMP. He parted ways with FMP in October 2020, after playing only one ABA game. In December 2020, he signed for Hungarian team KTE-Duna Aszfalt.

== Career statistics ==
Legend
GP	Games played	GS	Games started	MPG	Minutes per game
FG%	Field-goal percentage	3P%	3-point field-goal percentage	FT%	Free-throw percentage
RPG	Rebounds per game	APG	Assists per game	SPG	Steals per game
BPG	Blocks per game	PPG	Points per game	PIR	Performance index rating
**Bold**	Career high

=== EuroLeague ===
Year	Team	GP	GS	MPG	FG%	3P%	FT%	RPG	APG	SPG	BPG	PPG	PIR
2010–11	Partizan	2	0	1.1	.000	.000	.000	.0	.0	.0	.0	.0	.0
2011–12	Partizan	5	0	3.0	.000	.000	.000	.2	.0	.2	.0	.0	-.8
2014–15	Turów	**10**	**3**	**24.4**	**.389**	**.382**	**.867**	**2.9**	**2.9**	**.3**	**.1**	**9.5**	**11.5**
Career		18	3	14.5	.384	.371	.867	1.7	1.6	.2	.1	5.3	6.2

== National team career ==
Jaramaz was a member of the Serbia U16 national team which won a gold medal at the 2007 FIBA Europe Under-16 Championship.

== Personal life ==
His younger brother is Ognjen, also a professional basketball player.
