= Pabellón Municipal de Deportes La Casilla =

Basketball arena in Bilbao, Spain

- La Casilla
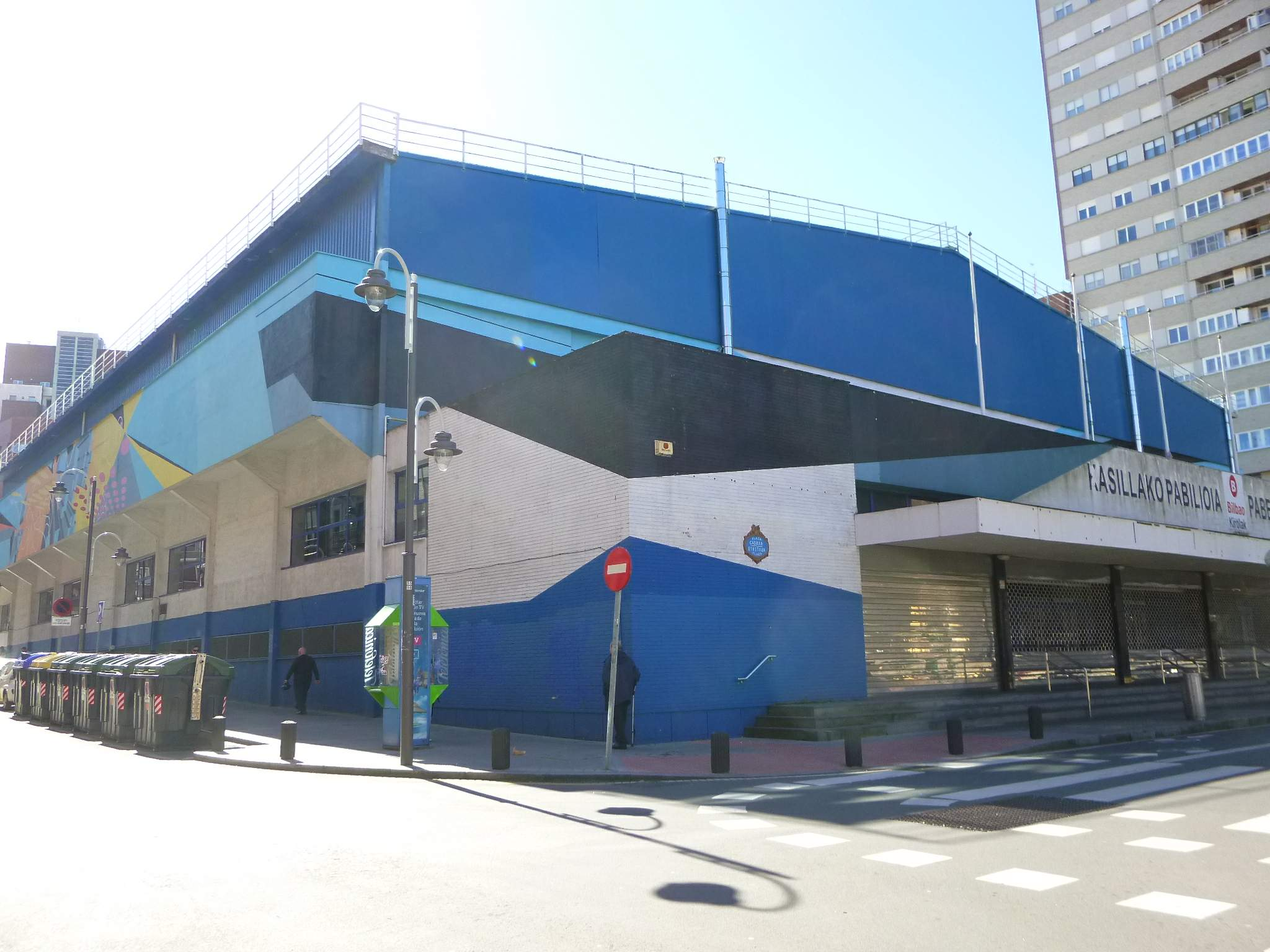
- Interactive map of Pabellón Municipal de Deportes La Casilla
- Location: Plaza de la Casilla s/n, 48012 Bilbao, Basque Country, Spain
- Coordinates: 43°15′23.43″N 2°56′36.95″W
- Capacity: 5,440
- Type: Basketball arena

Construction
- Opened: 20 May 1967

Tenant
- Bilbao Basket (2000–2009)

Pabellon Municipal de Deportes La Casilla is a 5,000-seat arena in Bilbao, Spain, primarily used for basketball. It was the home arena of Bilbao Basket.
