= Ivan Batur =

Croatian basketball player

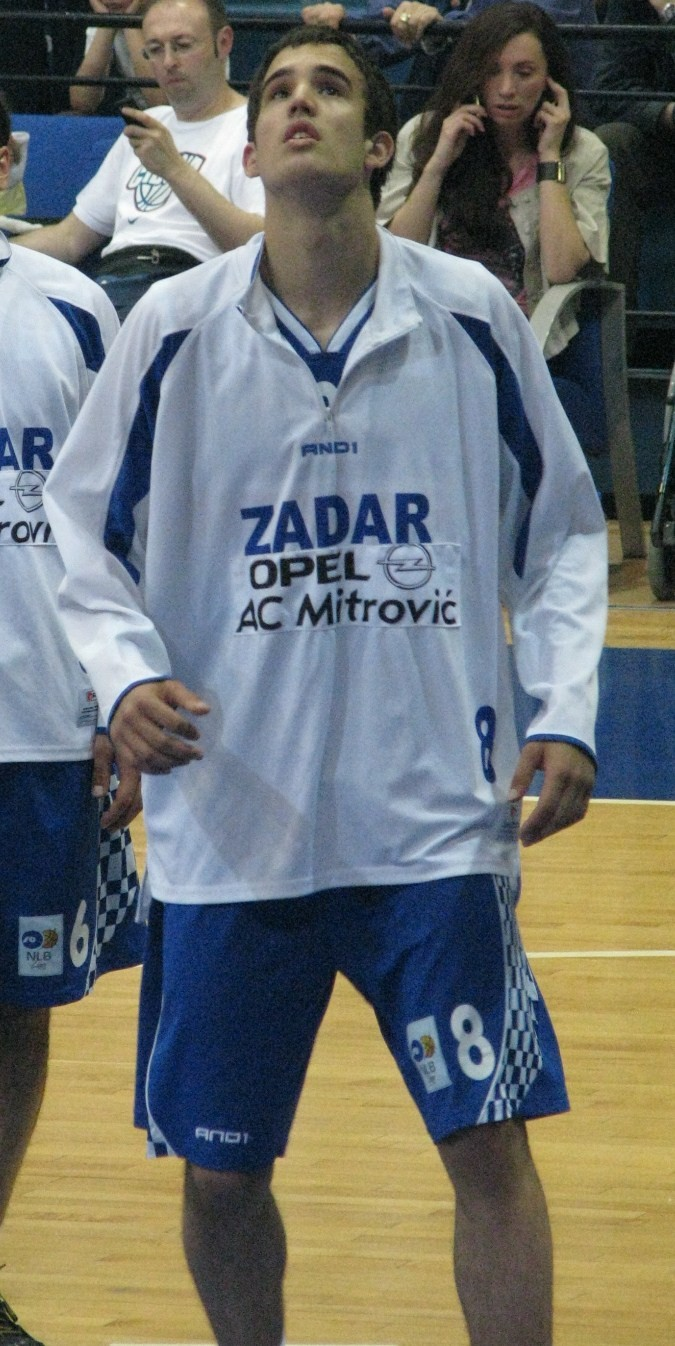
- Ivan Batur in 2010

No. 3 – Zabok
- Position: Shooting guard / small forward
- League: Croatian League; ABA League Second Division

Personal information
- Born: July 4, 1991 (age 35) Zadar, PR Croatia, FPR Yugoslavia
- Listed height: 6 ft 8 in (2.03 m)
- Listed weight: 205 lb (93 kg)

Career information
- NBA draft: 2013: undrafted
- Playing career: 2009–present

Career history
- 2009–2014: Zadar
- 2014–2017: Zagreb
- 2017–2018: Rogaška
- 2018–2019: Zabok
- 2019–2020: Adria Oil Škrljevo
- 2020–2023: Gorica
- 2023–present: Zabok
Medals
Men's basketball
Representing Croatia
World U-19 Championship
Bronze medal – third place	2009 New Zealand	U-19 Team
European U-18 Championship
Bronze medal – third place	2008 Greece	U-18 Team

Ivan Batur (born July 4, 1991) is a Croatian professional basketball player playing for Zabok of the Croatian League. He plays the shooting guard and small forward positions.

== Playing career ==
Batur grew up in KK Zadar. He was part of the Croatian national basketball team youth selections. With the national team he won two bronze medals at European youth championships. After winning his second medal in the summer of 2009 he signed his first professional contract with KK Zadar. In the summer of 2013, he renewed his contract. In June 2014, he left Zadar and in August 2014 joined KK Zagreb.
