= Ivan Strebkov (basketball) =

Russian basketball player

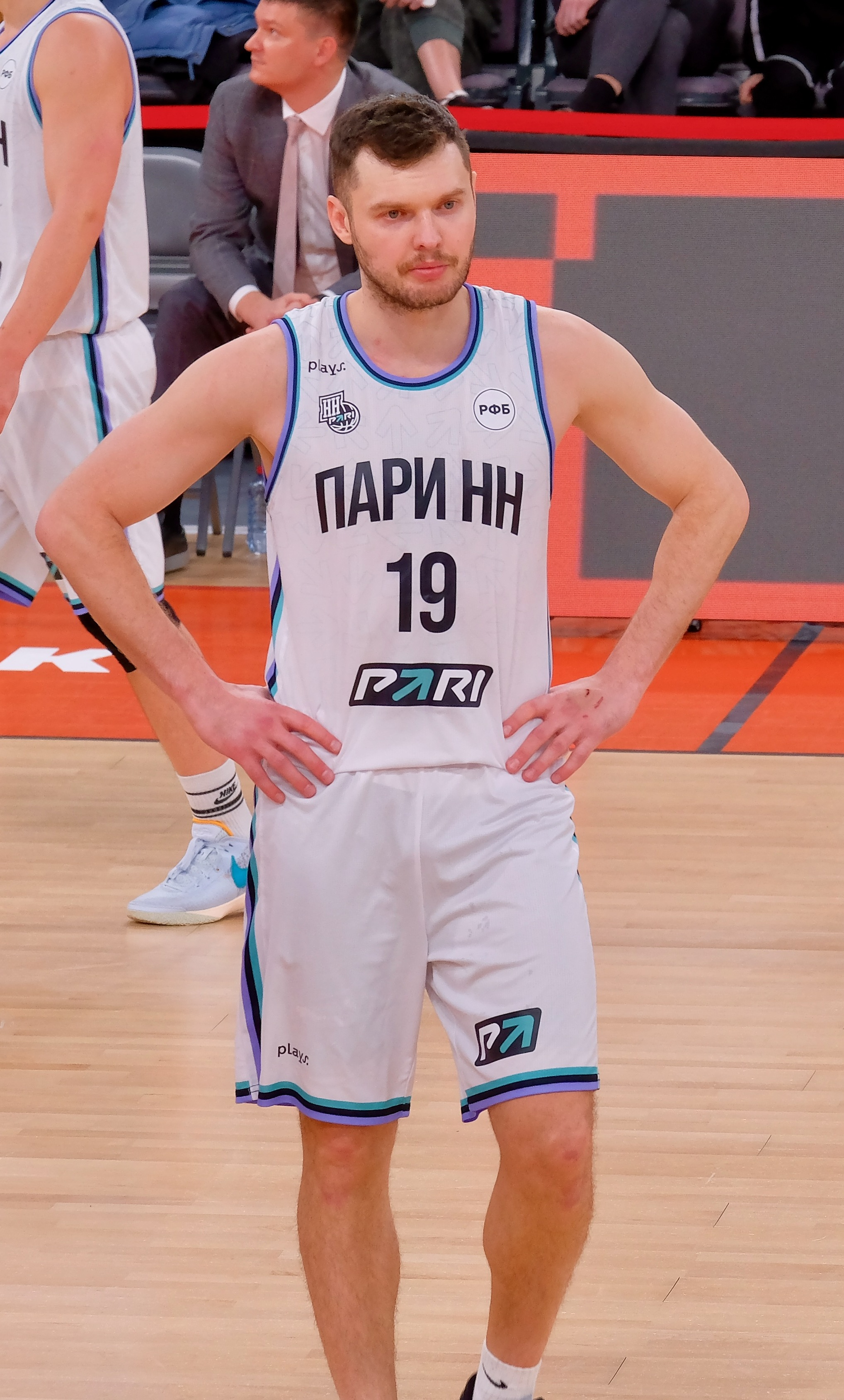
- Strebkov with Nizhny Novgorod in 2024

No. 19 – Dynamo Vladivostok
- Position: Point guard
- League: VTB United League

Personal information
- Born: July 27, 1991 (age 35) Almaty, Soviet Union
- Listed height: 1.93 m (6 ft 4 in)
- Listed weight: 85 kg (187 lb)

Career information
- NBA draft: 2013: undrafted
- Playing career: 2012–present

Career history
- 2012–2015: CSKA Moscow
- 2013–2014: → Avtodor Saratov
- 2015–2024: Nizhny Novgorod
- 2025–present: Dynamo Vladivostok

Career highlights
- 2× VTB United League champion (2013, 2015)

Ivan Vitalevich Strebkov (Russian: Иван Витальевич Стребков, born July 27, 1991) is a Russian professional basketball player for Dynamo Vladivostok of the VTB United League. Standing at 1.93 m (6 ft 4 in), he plays the point guard position.

== Professional career ==
Strebkov started his professional career in CSKA Moscow back in 2012. On January 3, 2013, Strebkov was sent on loan to Avtodor Saratov for the rest of the season. On July 25, 2013, CSKA Moscow decided to Strebkov keep playing for Avtador Saratov in the upcoming season. He signed with Nizhny Novgorod in 2015. He averaged 6.2 points per game during the 2019-20 season and re-signed with the club on June 30, 2020.
