= Pertev Öngüner =

Turkish basketball player (born 1991)

Mamak Bld. Ankara DSİ Era
- Position: Shooting guard
- League: Turkish Basketball Second League

Personal information
- Born: January 15, 1991 (age 35) Altındağ, Ankara, Turkey
- Listed height: 6 ft 5 in (1.96 m)
- Listed weight: 201 lb (91 kg)

Career information
- Playing career: 2009–present

Career history
- 2009–2010: Türk Telekom
- 2010–2011: Bornova Belediye
- 2011–2012: Aliağa Petkim
- 2012: Olin Edirne
- 2012–2013: Yeşilgiresun Belediye
- 2013–2015: Türk Telekom
- 2015–present: Mamak Bld. Ankara DSİ Era

Pertev Öngüner (born January 15, 1991) is a Turkish professional basketball player who plays as a shooting guard for Mamak Bld. Ankara DSİ Era of the Turkish Basketball Second League.
