= Patrick Heckmann =

German basketball player (born 1992)

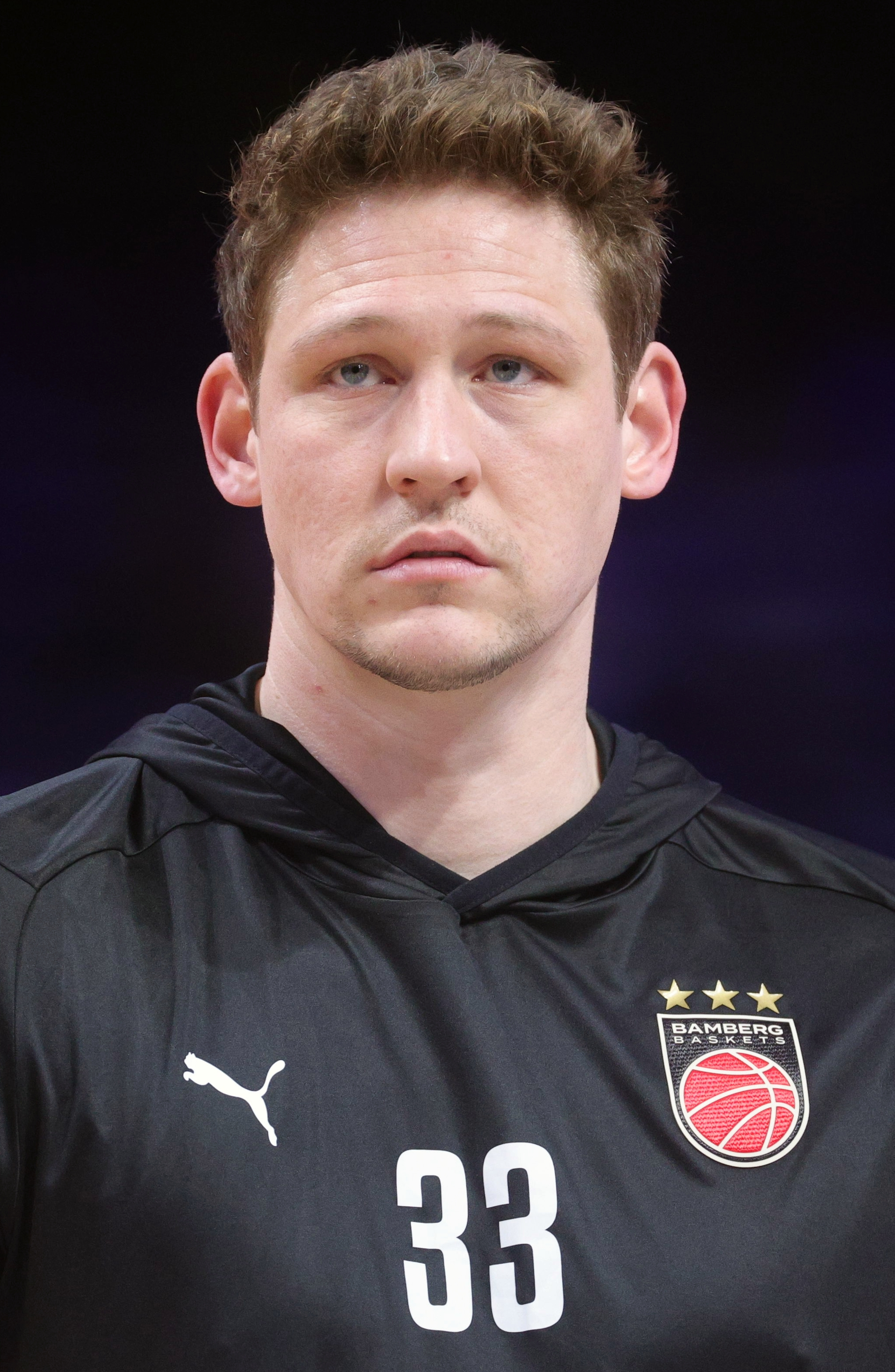
- Heckmann in April 2024

No. 33 – Telekom Baskets Bonn
- Position: Small forward
- League: Basketball Bundesliga

Personal information
- Born: 27 February 1992 (age 34) Mainz, Germany
- Listed height: 1.98 m (6 ft 6 in)
- Listed weight: 100 kg (220 lb)

Career information
- College: Boston College (2011–2015)
- NBA draft: 2015: undrafted
- Playing career: 2015–present

Career history
- 2015–2019: Brose Bamberg
- 2019–2021: ratiopharm Ulm
- 2021–2024: Brose Bamberg
- 2024: Hamburg Towers
- 2024–2025: Skyliners Frankfurt
- 2026–present: Telekom Baskets Bonn

Career highlights
- German League champion (2016); German Cup winner (2017); German League All-Star (2016)

Patrick Heckmann (born 27 February 1992) is a German professional basketball player for Telekom Baskets Bonn of the Basketball Bundesliga (BBL). He played college basketball for Boston College.

== College statistics ==
SEASON AVERAGES
SEASON	TEAM	MIN	FGM-FGA	FG%	3PM-3PA	3P%	FTM-FTA	FT%	REB	AST	BLK	STL	PF	TO	PTS
2014-15	BC	29.3	2.9-6.2	.470	0.8-2.7	.287	1.8-2.3	.787	4.4	2.7	0.4	1.3	2.8	1.9	8.4
2013-14	BC	16.1	1.9-4.3	.448	0.9-2.5	.346	1.2-1.7	.717	2.1	0.8	0.1	0.3	2.2	0.9	6.0
2012-13	BC	23.3	2.5-5.4	.455	1.3-3.4	.375	1.8-2.3	.813	2.5	1.5	0.4	0.9	2.4	1.2	8.0
2011-12	BC	22.0	2.5-5.5	.459	0.7-2.0	.349	2.5-3.5	.718	3.0	1.7	0.1	0.5	1.8	3.0	8.3

== Early life ==
Patrick Heckmann graduate from the Theresianum Gymnasium Mainz.

== Professional career ==
In June 2015 Heckmann signed with German team Brose Bamberg. In December 2016, he signed a two-year extension with the team. In February 2019, Heckmann signed a deal with ratiopharm Ulm.

On 1 July 2021 he signed with Brose Bamberg of the Basketball Bundesliga (BBL).

On August 26, 2024, he signed with Hamburg Towers of the Basketball Bundesliga.

On November 30, 2024, he signed with Skyliners Frankfurt of the Basketball Bundesliga (BBL).

== International career ==
In 2012, Heckmann played in 2 exhibition games for the German national basketball team.
