= Varaždin Apostol =

1454 liturgical book

- Author: three transcribers of Countess Kantakuzina Katarina Branković
- Original title: Вараждински апостол
- Language: Serbian recension of Old Church Slavonic
- Publication date: 1454

The Varaždin Apostol (Serbian Cyrillic: Вараждински апостол, Croatian: Varaždinski apostol) is a hand-written Orthodox liturgical book written in 1454. It is named after the northern Croatian city of Varaždin. The book represents the oldest preserved text in Cyrillic from the territory of today's Croatia. It contains the Acts of the Apostles and the New Testament epistles, and is kept today in the Museum of Serbian Orthodox Church in Belgrade, Serbia. The Varaždin Apostol was made by three transcribers of Countess Kantakuzina Katarina Branković, daughter of the Serbian despot Đurađ Branković and his wife Irene Kantakouzene, and the wife of Ulrich II, Count of Celje. The text is written in the Resava orthography (Manasija monastery) with elements of the Raška orthography and the Mount Athos redaction, too. The language is the Serbian dialect of Old Church Slavonic. On the occasion of the 550th anniversary of the Apostol, the Serbian Orthodox Church issued a limited edition of 300 copies. As a gift from the Metropolitanate of Zagreb and Ljubljana, copies went to, among others, Serbian Patriarch Pavle, Croatian president Stjepan Mesić, the Lepavina Monastery, and the Celje city archive.

== See also ==
- List of medieval Serbian literature
- Metropolitanate of Zagreb and Ljubljana
- Serbs of Croatia
