= Chris Czerapowicz =

Swedish-American basketball player

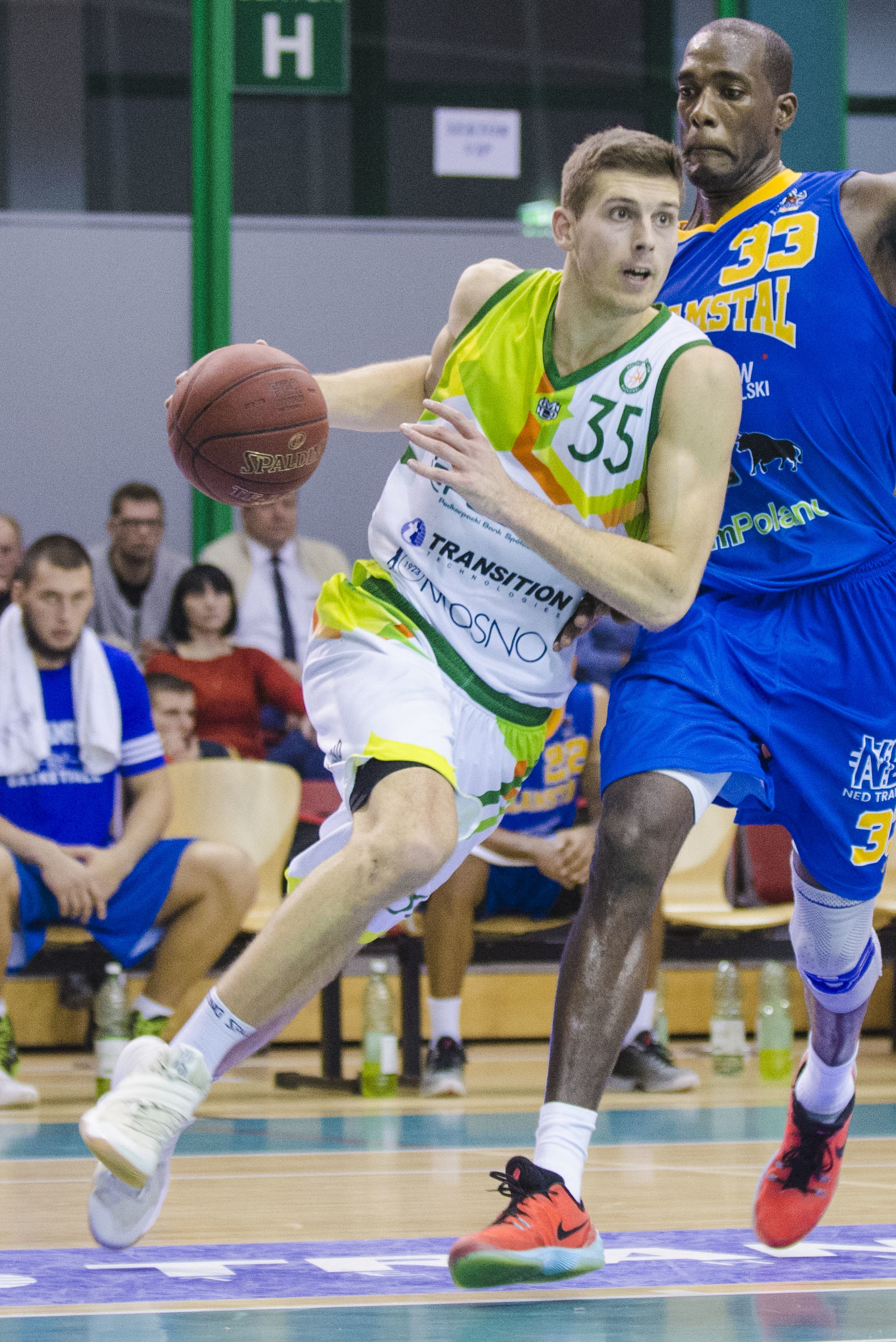
- Czerapowicz playing for MOSiR Krosno in 2016

No. 35 – CB Tizona
- Position: Shooting guard / small forward
- League: Primera FEB

Personal information
- Born: September 15, 1991 (age 35) Gothenburg, Sweden
- Listed height: 2.01 m (6 ft 7 in)
- Listed weight: 91 kg (201 lb)

Career information
- College: Davidson (2010–2014)
- NBA draft: 2014: undrafted
- Playing career: 2014–present

Career history
- 2014–2016: Södertälje Kings
- 2016–2017: MOSiR Krosno
- 2017: Andorra
- 2017–2018: Tsmoki-Minsk
- 2018–2019: Nizhny Novgorod
- 2019–2021: Obradoiro
- 2021–2022: Murcia
- 2022–2023: Andorra
- 2024–2025: GTK Gliwice
- 2026–present: CB Tizona

Career highlights
- 2× Swedish League champion (2015, 2016); Belarusian Premier League champion (2018)

Christopher Czerapowicz (/tʃəræˈpoʊwɪts/; born 15 September 1991) is a Swedish-American professional basketball player for CB Tizona of the Spanish Primera FEB. He is also a member of the Sweden national team, making his senior debut in 2016.

== College career ==
=== College statistics ===
Year	Team	GP	GS	MPG	FG%	3P%	FT%	RPG	APG	SPG	BPG	PPG
2010–11	Davidson Wildcats	21	0	9.3	.375	.291	.600	1.9	0.3	0.2	0.1	3.5
2011–12	Davidson Wildcats	33	7	25.1	.414	.342	.694	4.9	0.7	0.2	0.4	10.1
2012–13	Davidson Wildcats	34	34	25.7	.431	.390	.792	5.0	0.5	0.4	0.2	9.1
2013–14	Davidson Wildcats	33	33	25.3	.415	.288	.705	4.3	0.7	0.5	0.3	8.8

== Professional career ==
=== Södertälje Kings (2014–2016) ===
Czerapowicz began his career playing with the first-tiered Swedish team Södertälje Kings in the 2014-15 season, helping the team win the league both 2015 and 2016.

=== Miasto Szkła Krosno (2016–2017) ===
In June 2016, Czerapowicz joined first-tiered Polish team Miasto Szkła Krosno.

=== MoraBanc Andorra (2017) ===
In February 2017, it was announced that Czerapowicz was leaving Krosno to join BC MoraBanc Andorra playing in Spanish Liga ACB.

=== Tsmoki-Minsk (2017–2018) ===
In August 2017, it was announced that Czerapowicz would be joining Belarusian Tsmoki-Minsk in the Russian first-tier league VTB United League.

=== Nizhny Novgorod (2018–2019) ===
After a great first season in the VTB United League, BC Nizhny Novgorod announced in July that they had signed a two-year deal with Czerapowicz.

=== Monbus Obradoiro (2019–2021) ===
On July 19, 2019, Czerapowicz signed with Spanish club Monbus Obradoiro.

=== UCAM Murcia (2021–2022) ===
On July 5, 2021, Czerapowicz signed with UCAM Murcia.

=== BC Andorra (2022–2023) ===
On August 5, 2022, he has signed with MoraBanc Andorra of the LEB Oro.

=== GTK Gliwice (2024–2025) ===
On March 8, 2024, he signed with GTK Gliwice of the Polish Basketball League (PLK).

=== CB Tizona (2026–present) ===
On April 2, 2026, he signed for CB Tizona of the Spanish Primera FEB.

== International career ==
Czerapowicz began his career with the national team 2007, playing in the U16 (2007) team. He has also represented Sweden in the U18 (2008, 2009), U20 (2010, 2011) and UNI (2013) teams. He was invited to play with the senior team for EuroBasket 2013 but declined due to unfinished studies at Davidson. His senior debut came at the EuroBasket 2017 qualification 2016.
