= 2021–22 Helsingborg BBK season =

Helsingborg BBK Women
2021-22 season
- Sports Director: Ville Tuominen
- Chairman: Anders Sergel
- Head coach: (Greece) Athanasios Niklas
- Arena: GA Hallen
- Basketligan dam: 11th
- Scoring leader: (United States) Japonica James 15.8
- Rebounding leader: (United States) Katherine Kain 10.2
- Assists leader: (Sweden) Divora Alem 4
- Highest home attendance: 250
- Lowest home attendance: 60
- Average home attendance: 99
- Biggest win: A3 Basket 46-55 Helsingborg (20 November 2021)
- Biggest defeat: Luleå Basket 100-47 Helsingborg (20 February 2022)
- All statistics correct as of 17 March, 2022.

HBBK Men
- Head coach: (Spain) Xavi Mascaró
- Superettan: 7th
- Scoring leader: (Canada) Sukhjot Bains 15.7
- Rebounding leader: (Canada) Sukhjot Bains 10.3
- Assists leader: (Bosnia and Herzegovina) Nebojsa Maksimovic 8.5
- Highest home attendance: 300
- Lowest home attendance: 65
- Average home attendance: 196
- Biggest win: Helsingborg 114-86 Norrort (6 March 2022)
- Biggest defeat: Kalmar 104-64 Helsingborg (9 October 2021)
- All statistics correct as of 14 March, 2022.

During the 2021–22 season the men's team will play in Superettan. It is also the women's second consecutive season in Basketligan dam.

== Players ==
=== Men ===
==== Squad information ====
2021-22 HBBK Men's roster
Players
Coaches

Pos.	No.	Nat.	Name	Ht.	Wt.	Age
G	3	(Sweden)	Gabriel Alvesol	1.75 m (5 ft 9 in)		28 – 27 November 1996
G	4	(Sweden)	Anton Persson	1.80 m (5 ft 11 in)		27 – 6 December 1997
F	5	(Sweden)	Felix Carlsson	1.98 m (6 ft 6 in)		30 – 19 September 1995
G	6	(Sweden)	Rami Ismail	1.78 m (5 ft 10 in)		28 – 2 January 1997
F/C	7	(Sweden)	Erik Joelsson (C)	1.96 m (6 ft 5 in)		28 – 3 May 1997
C	8	(Sweden)	Ahmad Okdeh
G/F	9	(Sweden)	Alexander Samkovski	1.90 m (6 ft 3 in)		25 – 1 February 2000
F	10	(Sweden)	Patrik Andersson (VC)	1.91 m (6 ft 3 in)		30 – 5 December 1994
F	11	(Canada)	Sukhjot Bains	1.98 m (6 ft 6 in)		29 – 25 January 1996
G/F	12	(Sweden)	Hugo Grundström			22 – 10 February 2003
G/F	13	(Sweden)	Oliver Novakovic	1.90 m (6 ft 3 in)	80 kg (176 lb)	25 – 12 February 2000
G	14	(Sweden)	Viktor Stepanovski	1.83 m (6 ft 0 in)		23 – 4 August 2002
F/C	16	(Spain)	Miguel Lopez Dominguez	2.03 m (6 ft 8 in)		27 – 5 June 1998
C	16	(Norway)	Alex Tastad	2.05 m (6 ft 9 in)		32 – 11 September 1993
G/F	17	(Sweden)	David Tastad	1.83 m (6 ft 0 in)		23 – 14 June 2002
G	18	(Bosnia and Herzegovina)	Nebojsa Maksimovic	1.85 m (6 ft 1 in)	83 kg (183 lb)	33 – 23 February 1992

Head coach

- Xavier Mascaró

Assistant coach(es)

- César Iglesias Porto

Legend

- (C) Team captain
- (VC) Vice Captain
- Injured

- Roster

=== Women ===
==== Squad information ====
2021-22 HBBK Women's roster
Players
Coaches

Pos.	No.	Nat.	Name	Ht.	Wt.	Age
F/C	2	(Sweden)	Tilda Mauritzson	1.82 m (6 ft 0 in)		23 – 28 October 2002
G/F	4	(Sweden)	Alma Fransson	1.74 m (5 ft 9 in)		29 – 4 October 1996
G	5	(Sweden)	Vendela Af Malmborg (injured)	1.64 m (5 ft 5 in)		24 – 18 October 2001
F	6	(Sweden)	Martine Landström	1.74 m (5 ft 9 in)		28 – 6 May 1997
G	7	(Sweden)	Tajma Krslak	1.79 m (5 ft 10 in)		23 – 1 June 2002
G	8	(Finland)	Ebba Pekonen	1.72 m (5 ft 8 in)		24 – 21 August 2001
G	9	(Sweden)	Divora Alem	1.71 m (5 ft 7 in)		24 – 23 October 2001
F	10	(Sweden)	Mathilda Ågren (C)	1.76 m (5 ft 9 in)		29 – 29 March 1996
G	11	(Sweden)	Isabelle Finke	1.72 m (5 ft 8 in)		30 – 9 December 1994
F	14	(Sweden)	Maryam Al-Ameri	1.84 m (6 ft 0 in)		22 – 14 January 2003
F	16	(Sweden)	Miriam Wahlqvist	1.80 m (5 ft 11 in)		21 – 22 April 2004
F	18	(Sweden)	Tyra Eriksson			21 – 17 May 2004
F	20	(United States)	Japonica James	1.80 m (5 ft 11 in)		27 – 20 July 1998
C	31	(United States)	Katherine Kain	1.96 m (6 ft 5 in)		26 – 18 May 1999
		(Sweden)	Leona Ruhek	1.76 m (5 ft 9 in)		21 – 6 April 2004
F	19	(Sweden)	Patricia Axelsson	1.79 m (5 ft 10 in)		28 – 28 October 1997
F/C	12	(Sweden)	Emely Dalén	1.84 m (6 ft 0 in)		29 – 7 December 1995
G	8	(France)	Rachel Clet	1.61 m (5 ft 3 in)		24 – 22 January 2001

Head coach

- Athanasios Niklas

Assistant coach(es)

- Puja Shahbani Nejad

Legend

- (C) Team captain
- Injured

- Roster

== Preseason ==
Win Loss

=== Men ===
September 11, 2021	Helsingborg BBK	92–98	IK Eos Lund	Helsingborg
				Arena: GA Hallen

September 12, 2021	Helsingborg BBK	69–76	Högsbo Basket	Helsingborg
Solidsport				Arena: GA Hallen

September 18, 2021	BK Amager	72–83	Helsingborg BBK	Trelleborg
14:00
				Arena: Västervångshallen
Note: BK Amager play in Basketligaen. The highest tier of Danish Basketball

September 19, 2021	Kalmar Saints	vs.	Helsingborg BBK	Trelleborg
14:00
				Arena: Västervångshallen

=== Women ===
September 4, 2021	Högsbo Basket	81–50	Helsingborg BBK	Gothenburg
14:00
				Arena: Gothia Arena

September 11, 2021	Alvik	49–44	Helsingborg BBK	Uppsala
17:30
				Arena: Upplands Bilforum USIF Arena

September 12, 2021	Uppsala Basket	55–39	Helsingborg BBK	Uppsala
12:00
				Arena: Upplands Bilforum USIF Arena

September 17, 2021	Helsingborg BBK	80–74	Falcon Basketball Klub	Helsingborg
19:00
				Arena: GA Hallen
Note: Falcon play in Dameligaen. The highest tier of Danish Basketball

September 18, 2021	IK Eos Lund	vs.	Helsingborg BBK	Lund
15:00
				Arena: Eoshallen

== Regular season ==
Win Loss

=== Men ===
==== Superettan ====
September 25, 2021 1	Uppsala Basket	80–59	Helsingborg BBK	Uppsala
15:00	Scoring by quarter: 17-17, 23-18, 24-13, 16-11
Solidsport	Pts: Zekovic 21; Rebs: Friberg, Jädersten, Axelsson 7 Asts: Granat 5	Boxscore	Pts: Bains 16; Rebs: Bains 8 Asts: Maksimovic 4	Arena: Upplands Bilforum USIF Arena; Attendance: 129

October 3, 2021 2	Helsingborg BBK	97–98	IK Eos Lund	Helsingborg
15:00	Scoring by quarter: 25-'27, 27-22, 26-31, 19-19
Solidsport	Pts: Smakowski 21; Rebs: Bains 14; Asts: Maksimovic 14	Boxscore	Pts: Svensson 25; Rebs: Sundström 8 Asts: Svensson 6	Arena: GA Hallen; Attendance: 200

October 9, 2021 3	Kalmar Saints	104–64	Helsingborg BBK	Kalmar
15:00	Scoring by quarter: 28-11, 28-17, 31-17, 17-21
Solidsport	Pts: Tratnik 29; Rebs: Tratnik 14; Asts: S. Sjöberg 8	Boxscore	Pts: Persson 17; Rebs: Bains 8 Asts: Persson 4	Arena: Akea Arena; Attendance: 237

October 23, 2021 4	Helsingborg BBK	88–99	Högsbo Basket	Helsingborg
17:15	Scoring by quarter: 32-21, 28-28, 13-23, 15-27
Solidsport	Pts: Carlsson 26; Rebs: Bains 9 Asts: Maksimovic 9	Boxscore	Pts: Vitali 28; Rebs: Vitali 12; Asts: Vitali, Sjöström 4	Arena: GA Hallen; Attendance: 89

November 6, 2021 5	Helsingborg BBK	66–68	Trelleborg Pirates	Helsingborg
14:30	Scoring by quarter: 15-18, 18-13, 18-16, 15-21
Solidsport	Pts: Joelsson 21; Rebs: Bains 10; Asts: Maksimovic 8	Boxscore	Pts: Morales 23; Rebs: Tuckson, Morales 11; Asts: Tuckson 9	Arena: GA Hallen; Attendance: 300

November 13, 2021 6	RIG Mark	73–94	Helsingborg BBK	Kinna
13:00	Scoring by quarter: 19-29, 26-24, 16-18, 12-23
Solidsport	Pts: Broström 28; Rebs: Broström, Caldwell 5 Asts: Delryd, Karras 4	Boxscore	Pts: Maksimovic 25; Rebs: Joelsson 15; Asts: Maksimovic 6	Arena: Kinnahallen; Attendance: 20

December 4, 2021 7	Högsbo Basket	89–69	Helsingborg BBK	Gothenburg
15:30	Scoring by quarter: 20-21, 22-16, 23-18, 24-14
Solidsport	Pts: Vitali 21; Rebs: Vitali 18; Asts: Vitali 6	Boxscore	Pts: Andersson 22; Rebs: Bains 15; Asts: Maksimovic 9	Arena: Gothia Arena 2 Attendance: 175

December 12, 2021 8	Helsingborg BBK	87–90	Wetterbygden Stars	Helsingborg
13:30	Scoring by quarter: 25-23, 16-22, 20-20, 26-25
Solidsport	Pts: Carlsson 23; Rebs: Bains 18; Asts: Maksimovic 5 PIR: Bains 29	Boxscore	Pts: Eriksson Hansson 29; Rebs: Ekenstierna 10; Asts: Ekenstierna, Grönhage 3 PIR: Eriksson Hansson 32	Arena: GA Hallen; Attendance: 65

December 18, 2021 9	Ockelbo BBK	78–81	Helsingborg BBK	Ockelbo
16:00	Scoring by quarter: 20-21, 20-20, 20-15, 18-25
Solidsport	Pts: Stark, Lundström 13; Rebs: Lundström 10; Asts: Jonsson 6 PIR: Osman 14	Boxscore	Pts: Stepanovski 17; Rebs: Maksimovic 11; Asts: Maksimovic 4 PIR: Bains 17	Arena: Kuxahallen; Attendance: 150

January 22, 2022 10	Trelleborg Pirates	79–87	Helsingborg BBK	Trelleborg
15:00	Scoring by quarter: 19-25, 11-14, 14-18, 35-30
Solidsport	Pts: Tuckson 23; Rebs: Medori 11; Asts: Tuckson, Medori, Svenonius 4	Boxscore	Pts: Bains 26; Rebs: Bains 11; Asts: Maksimovic 14; PIR: Bains 31	Arena: Västervångshallen

January 29, 2022 11	Helsingborg BBK	75–90	Kalmar Saints	Helsingborg
14:00	Scoring by quarter: 29-20, 19-19, 14-27, 13-16
Solidsport	Pts: Bains 19; Rebs: Joelsson 7 Asts: Maksimovic 14; PIR: Bains 20	Boxscore	Pts: Tratnik 26; Rebs: Sjöberg 11; Asts: Tratnik 9	Arena: GA Hallen; Attendance: 104

February 5, 2022 12	AIK Basket	70–84	Helsingborg BBK	Stockholm
15:00	Scoring by quarter: 16-13, 13-20, 23-23, 18-28
Solidsport	Pts: E. Inan, 25; Rebs: Rahmati 9 Asts: Blazevic 12	Boxscore	Pts: Andersson 18; Rebs: Joelsson 10; Asts: Maksimovic 7 PIR: Maksimovic 25	Arena: Vasalundshallen

February 6, 2022 13	Norrort	86–87	Helsingborg BBK	Stockholm
16:00	Scoring by quarter: 21-22, 19-20, 30-22, 16-23
Solidsport	Pts: Saleman 27; Rebs: Herlitz 12; Asts: Flocke 7	Boxscore	Pts: Bains 28; Rebs: Joelsson 12; Asts: Maksimovic 13; PIR: Bains 34	Arena: Tibblehallen; Attendance: 53

February 12, 2022 14	Helsingborg BBK	75–57	Team4Q	Helsingborg
15:00	Scoring by quarter: 24-16, 23-18, 14-9, 14-14
Solidsport	Pts: Andersson 19; Rebs: Bains 17; Asts: Maksimovic 8 PIR: Andersson 20	Boxscore	Pts: R. Dragic, Vukovic 13; Rebs: Kuksta, Novakovic 8 Asts: Rietz 4	Arena: GA Hallen; Attendance: 204

February 15, 2022 15	Team4Q	60–82	Helsingborg BBK	Helsingborg
19:30	Scoring by quarter: 15-23, 20-25, 13-27, 12-17
Solidsport	Pts: Rietz 17; Rebs: Kuksta 8 Asts: Rasmussen 6	Boxscore	Pts: Persson 21; Rebs: Bains 11; Asts: Maksimovic, Persson 5 PIR: Maksimovic 23	Arena: GA Hallen; Attendance: 60

February 19, 2022 16	Wetterbygden Stars	88–85	Helsingborg BBK	Huskvarna
16:00	Scoring by quarter: 27-22, 19-25, 19-18, 23-20
Solidsport	Pts: Eriksson Hansson 18; Rebs: Ekenstierna 10; Asts: Wazzi 8	Boxscore	Pts: Bains 29; Rebs: Bains 13; Asts: Maksimovic 12; PIR: Bains 36	Arena: Huskvarna Sporthall; Attendance: 123

February 23, 2022 17	IK Eos Lund	100–84	Helsingborg BBK	Lund
19:00	Scoring by quarter: 29-19, 28-25, 17-15, 26-25
Solidsport	Pts: Von Uthmann 24; Rebs: Von Uthmann 13; Asts: Jonevret 4	Boxscore	Pts: Andersson, Smakowski 17; Rebs: Erhardt 12; Asts: Bains, Maksimovic 7 PIR: Maksimovic 23	Arena: Eoshallen; Attendance: 203

February 26, 2022 18	Helsingborg BBK	83–66	AIK Basket	Helsingborg
18:00	Scoring by quarter: 17-17, 26-23, 23-7, 17-19
Solidsport	Pts: Persson 21; Rebs: Bains 9 Asts: Maksimovic 9 PIR: Bains 25	Boxscore	Pts: Gafor 16; Rebs: Rahamti 9 Asts: Blazevic 10	Arena: GA Hallen; Attendance: 89

March 5, 2022 19	Helsingborg BBK	74–77	RIG Mark	Helsingborg
15:00	Scoring by quarter: 20-16, 21-26, 19-17, 14-18
Solidsport	Pts: Persson 13; Rebs: Erhardt 8 Asts: Bains 5 PIR: Persson 11	Boxscore	Pts: Broström 27; Rebs: Broström 5 Asts: Andersson, Cupan 3	Arena: GA Hallen; Attendance: 69

March 6, 2022 20	Helsingborg BBK	114–86	Norrort	Helsingborg
15:00	Scoring by quarter: 33-26, 28-21, 28-11, 25-28
Solidsport	Pts: Andersson 23; Rebs: Maksimovic 10; Asts: Maksimovic 16; PIR: Maksimovic 42	Boxscore	Pts: Ehlde 23; Rebs: Friman 8 Asts: Folcke 5	Arena: GA Hallen; Attendance: 88

March 12, 2022 21	Helsingborg BBK	77–62	Ockelbo BBK	Helsingborg
15:00	Scoring by quarter: 13-13, 23-20, 16-13, 25-16
Solidpsort	Pts: Smakowski 12; Rebs: Bains 12; Asts: Carlsson, Smakowski 4 PIR: Carlsson 19	Boxscore	Pts: Jonsson 15; Rebs: Arikawe 9 Asts: Stark 8	Arena: GA Hallen; Attendance: 89

March 13, 2022 22	Helsingborg BBK	73–89	Uppsala Basket	Helsingborg
18:00	Scoring by quarter: 17-17, 10-14, 24-33, 22-25
Solidsport	Pts: Bains 17; Rebs: Bains 14; Asts: Persson 4 PIR: Bains 30	Boxscore	Pts: Axelsson 23; Rebs: Jädersten 8 Asts: Nakos 4	Arena: GA Hallen

==== Playoffs ====
March 26, 2022 QF G1	Helsingborg BBK	75–79	Kalmar
15:00	Scoring by quarter: 13-23, 18-19, 15-10, 29-27
Solidsport	Pts: Bains 25; Rebs: Erhardt 10; Asts: Bains, Ismail, Smakowski 2 PIR: Bains 25	Boxscore	Pts: S. Sjöberg 18; Rebs: Birgemo 9 Asts: Tratnik 12	Arena: GA Hallen

=== Women ===
==== Basketligan dam ====
September 25, 2021 1	Helsingborg BBK	63–80	Wetterbygden Sparks	Helsingborg
15:00	Scoring by quarter: 15-20, 13-19, 19-16, 16-25
Solidsport	Pts: James 22; Rebs: James 11; Asts: Alem 7	Boxscore	Pts: Iderstål 25; Rebs: Whitehead 8 Asts: Sjökvist 6	Arena: GA Hallen; Attendance: 60

October 2, 2021 2	Norrköping Dolphins	80–54	Helsingborg BBK	Norrköping
15:00	Scoring by quarter: 32-12, 19-13, 18-18, 11-11
Solidsport	Pts: Johnson, Gyberg 12; Rebs: Oliver 10; Asts: Murray 5	Boxscore	Pts: James 14; Rebs: James 13; Asts: Pekonen 3	Arena: Stadium Arena; Attendance: 315

October 9, 2021 3	Helsingborg BBK	72–65	Borås Basket	Helsingborg
15:00	Scoring by quarter: 26-17, 16-25, 14-13, 16-10
Solidsport	Pts: James 23; Rebs: James 14; Asts: Ågren, Alem 6	Boxscore	Pts: Johnson 23; Rebs: Wade 13; Asts: Ström 5	Arena: GA Hallen; Attendance: 104

October 16, 2021 4	Mark Basket	74–60	Helsingborg BBK	Kinna
16:00	Scoring by quarter: 20-19, 16-13, 15-20, 23-8
Solidsport	Pts: Hernandez 18; Rebs: Hernandez 10; Asts: Hernandez 3	Boxscore	Pts: James 16; Rebs: James 10; Asts: Pekonen 6	Arena: Kinnahallen; Attendance: 216

October 23, 2021 5	Helsingborg BBK	50–59	Visby Ladies	Helsingborg
14:30	Scoring by quarter: 11-15, 15-15, 12-16, 12-13
Solidsport	Pts: James 13; Rebs: Kain 17; Asts: Ågren 4	Boxscore	Pts: Wingate 22; Rebs: Harrison 13; Asts: Agnig 3	Arena: GA Hallen; Attendance: 100

October 30, 2021 6	Östersund Basket	83–64	Helsingborg BBK	Östersund
15:00	Scoring by quarter: 28-14, 22-17, 27-16, 6-17
Solidsport	Pts: Popkey 23; Rebs: Ludqvist, Kraker 7 Asts: Kraker 10	Boxscore	Pts: James 22; Rebs: Kain 9 Asts: Finke, Alem 3	Arena: Östersunds Sporthall; Attendance: 329

November 6, 2021 7	Helsingborg BBK	75–74	Uppsala Basket	Helsingborg
17:30	Scoring by quarter: 21-17, 16-22, 19-19, 19-16
Solidsport	Pts: James 19; Rebs: Ågren 10; Asts: Pekonen 10	Boxscore	Pts: Tivenius 22; Rebs: Haines 9 Asts: Haines 6	Arena: GA Hallen; Attendance: 250

November 17, 2021 8	Södertälje BBK	63–53	Helsingborg BBK	Södertälje
19:00	Scoring by quarter: 17-18, 19-15, 15-8, 12-12
Solidsport	Pts: Åström 18; Rebs: Molina 7 Asts: Molina 4 PIR: Molina 21	Boxscore	Pts: Kain 22; Rebs: Kain 16; Asts: Pekonen 4 PIR: Kain 26	Arena: Täljehallen; Attendance: 223

November 20, 2021 9	A3 Basket	46–55	Helsingborg BBK	Umeå
15:00	Scoring by quarter: 10-13, 9-13, 19-16, 8-13
Solidsport	Pts: Asoro 13; Rebs: Asoro 13; Asts: Brown 4 PIR: Asoro 22	Boxscore	Pts: Ågren 20; Rebs: Kain 13; Asts: Malmborg, Alem 3 PIR: Ågren 24	Arena: Umeå Energi Arena; Attendance: 121

November 28, 2021 10	Helsingborg BBK	48–78	Luleå Basket	Helsingborg
15:00
Solidsport	Pts: Kain 16; Rebs: Kain 15; Asts: Af Malmborg, Alem, Finke 3 PIR: Kain 25	Boxscore	Pts: McCarty-Williams 19; Rebs: Vesterberg 17; Asts: McCarty-Williams 5	Arena: GA Hallen

December 4, 2021 11	Helsingborg BBK	53–69	IK Eos Lund	Helsingborg
15:00	Scoring by quarter: 17-22, 16-10, 10-18, 10-19
Solidsport	Pts: Af Malmborg 14; Rebs: Kain 11; Asts: Af Malmborg, Alem 5	Boxscore	Pts: Christopher 22; Rebs: Viita 13; Asts: Christopher 5	Arena: GA Hallen; Attendance: 64

December 12, 2021 12	Helsingborg BBK	74–77	Högsbo Basket	Helsingborg
16:30	Scoring by quarter: 17-12, 15-20, 20-23, 22-22
Solidsport	Pts: Clet, Axelsson 14; Rebs: Kain, Alem 9 Asts: Clet 7 PIR: Clet 18	Boxscore	Pts: Campbell 27; Rebs: Campbell 16; Asts: Fredrikson, Noaksson 4 PIR: Campbell 30	Arena: GA Hallen

December 18, 2021 13	Helsingborg BBK	75–69	Alvik Basket	Helsingborg
14:30	Scoring by quarter: 14-19, 16-18, 25-11, 20-21
Solidsport	Pts: James 27; Rebs: Kain 14; Asts: Alem 6 PIR: James 30	Boxscore	Pts: Ljunggren 21; Rebs: Ljunggren, Mccarville 7 Asts: Taylor 4 PIR: Ljunggren 19	Arena: GA Hallen; Attendance: 65

December 27, 2021 14	Wetterbygden Sparks	72–75	Helsingborg BBK	Huskvarna
19:00	Scoring by quarter: 19-22, 19-16, 16-17, 18-20
Solidsport	Pts: Brown 19; Rebs: Whitehead 12; Asts: Brown 4 PIR: Brown 18	Boxscore	Pts: Clet 24; Rebs: Kain 15; Asts: Clet, Alem 3 PIR: Kain 24	Arena: Huskvarna Sporthall; Attendance: 139

January 15, 2022 15	Helsingborg BBK	67–58	Östersund Basket	Helsingborg
15:00	Scoring by quarter: 31-17, 10-22, 12-7, 14-12
Solidsport	Pts: James 27; Rebs: Kain 16; Asts: Alem 2 PIR: James, Kain 24	Boxscore	Pts: Popkey 16; Rebs: Popkey 8 Asts: Whitish 3 PIR: Popkey 19	Arena: GA Hallen; Attendance: 67

January 22, 2022 16	IK Eos Lund	86–72	Helsingborg BBK	Lund
14:30	Scoring by quarter: 33-27, 31-17, 7-14, 15-14
Solidsport	Pts: Cliney 20; Rebs: Cliney 7 Asts: Christopher 9	Boxscore	Pts: Axelsson, Kain 12; Rebs: James 14; Asts: Alem 5 PIR: Kain 26	Arena: Eoshallen

February 13, 2022 17	Högsbo Basket	62–54	Helsingborg BBK	Gothenburg
14:00	Scoring by quarter: 12-9, 10-18, 21-7, 19-20
Solidsport	Pts: Nofuente 16; Rebs: Campbell 14; Asts: Noaksson 4	Boxscore	Pts: Clet 22; Rebs: Kain 10; Asts: Alem 4 PIR: James 17	Arena: Gothia Arena; Attendance: 320

February 16, 2022 18	Helsingborg BBK	71–62	A3 Basket	Helsingborg
19:00	Scoring by quarter: 25-17, 11-25, 16-10, 19-10
Solidsport	Pts: Kain 26; Rebs: James, Kain 9 Asts: Clet 9 PIR: Kain 36	Boxscore	Pts: Brown 28; Rebs: Degbeon 13; Asts: Brown 4	Arena: GA Hallen; Attendance: 74

February 20, 2022 19	Luleå Basket	100–47	Helsingborg BBK	Luleå
17:00	Scoring by quarter: 27-11, 24-13, 28-14, 21-9
Solidsport	Pts: Mccarty-Williams 26; Rebs: Vesterberg 13; Asts: Mccarty-Williams, Vesterberg 7	Boxscore	Pts: Clet 11; Rebs: Alem 10; Asts: Alem 4	Arena: Luleå Energi Arena; Attendance: 2058

February 26, 2022 20	Helsingborg BBK	57–71	Norrköping Dolphins	Helsingborg
15:00	Scoring by quarter: 17-16, 15-20, 18-21, 7-14
Solidpsort	Pts: Kain 18; Rebs: Kain 15; Asts: Alem 4 PIR: Kain 24	Boxscore	Pts: Åhlberg 15; Rebs: Gyberg 6 Asts: Oliver 7	Arena: GA Hallen; Attendance: 115

March 2, 2022 21	Helsingborg BBK	75–83	Södertälje BBK	Helsingborg
19:00	Scoring by quarter: 25-19, 15-10, 21-29, 14-25
Solidsport	Pts: Kain 20; Rebs: Kain, Ågren 5 Asts: Alem 7 PIR: Kain 21	Boxscore	Pts: Claesson 22; Rebs: Åström 8 Asts: Molina 10	Arena: GA Hallen; Attendance: 100

March 5, 2022 22	Visby Ladies	vs.	Helsingborg BBK	Visby
16:00	Scoring by quarter: 22-14, 15-14, 15-14, 11-14
Solidsport	Pts: Kelliher, Wingate 14; Rebs: Harrison 12; Asts: Kelliher 5	Boxscore	Pts: Kain 16; Rebs: Kain 10; Asts: Alem 5 PIR: Kain 26	Arena: ICA Maxi Arena; Attendance: 272

March 6, 2022 23	Alvik Basket	73–66	Helsingborg BBK	Stockholm
15:00	Scoring by quarter: 14-17, 16-16, 23-18, 20-15
Solidsport	Pts: Ljunggren 27; Rebs: Ljunggren 7 Asts: Stern 5	Boxscore	Pts: James 19; Rebs: Ågren 9 Asts: Alem 7 PIR: James 19	Arena: Åkeshovshallen; Attendance: 131

March 12, 2022 24	Borås Basket	66–59	Helsingborg BBK	Borås
15:00	Scoring by quarter: 19-20, 14-15, 17-17, 16-7
Solidsport	Pts: Johnson 19; Rebs: Wade 12; Asts: Johnson 6	Boxscore	Pts: Alem, Clet 18; Rebs: Alem, Clet 11; Asts: Clet 6 PIR: Clet 25	Arena: Boråshallen; Attendance: 153

March 16, 2022 25	Helsingborg BBK	81–75(OT)	Mark Basket	Helsingborg
19:00	Scoring by quarter: 23-19, 21-17, 10-22, 14-10, Overtime: 13-7
Solidsport	Pts: Ågren 16; Rebs: Kain 13; Asts: Alem 5 PIR: Kain 27	Boxscore	Pts: Hicks 21; Rebs: Brown 12; Asts: Hicks 7	Arena: GA Hallen; Attendance: 93

March 20, 2022 26	Uppsala Basket	70–74(OT)	Helsingborg BBK	Uppsala
15:00	Scoring by quarter: 16-26, 22-12, 8-14, 19-13, Overtime: 5-9
Solidsport	Pts: Prytz 18; Rebs: Tivenius 17; Asts: Haines 6	Boxscore	Pts: James 18; Rebs: Alem, Clet 8 Asts: Alem 4 PIR: Alem 23	Arena: Upplands Bilforum USIF Arena; Attendance: 103
