= 2021–22 Swedish Basketball League season (women) =

Women's Swedish basketball league

Basketligan dam
- League: Basketligan
- Season: 2021-22 season
- Duration: 24 September 2021 - TBA
- Teams: 14
- TV partner(s): Solidsport

Regular season
- Relegated: Borås

Statistical leaders
Points	(United States) Jessica Kelliher	24.4
Rebounds	(United States) Rodjanae Wade	12.4
Assists	(United States) Jayde Christopher	6.8

Records
- Winning streak: Luleå (17)
- Losing streak: Borås (13)
- All statistics correct as of 31 October 2021.

The 2021–22 Swedish Basketball League season is the 21st season of the Swedish Basketball League (SBL), the top tier basketball league in Sweden. Luleå Basket are the defending champions.

== Teams ==
Team	City	Venue	Capacity
Borås Basket	Borås	Boråshallen	3,000
Luleå Basket	Luleå	Luleå Energi Arena	2,700
IK Eos	Lund	Eoshallen	350
Södertälje BBK	Södertälje	Täljehallen	2,100
Helsingborg BBK	Helsingborg	GA Hallen	500
Visby Ladies	Visby	ICA Maxi Arena	2,220
Östersund Basket	Östersund	Östersund Sporthall	1,700
Wetterbygden Sparks	Huskvarna	Huskvarna Sporthall	422
Uppsala Basket	Uppsala	Fyrishov	3,000
Norrköping Dolphins	Norrköping	Stadium Arena	3,500
Mark Basket	Kinna	Kinnahallen	N/A
Högsbo Basket	Gothenburg	Gothia Arena	1,000
Alvik Basket	Stockholm	Åkeshovshallen	N/A
A3 Basket	Umeå	Umea Energi Arena	2,000

Location of teams in the 2021-22 Basketligan

== League table ==
Pos	Team	Pld	W	L	PF	PA	PD	Pts	Qualification
1	Luleå	26	24	2	2361	1547	+814	48	Qualification to playoffs
2	Norrköping	26	20	6	2085	1836	+249	40	Qualification to playoffs
3	Östersund	26	18	8	2020	1900	+120	36	Qualification to playoffs
4	Umeå	26	17	9	1995	1824	+171	34	Qualification to playoffs
5	Alvik Basket	26	16	10	1993	1944	+49	32	Qualification to playoffs
6	Visby	26	13	13	1878	1980	−102	26	Qualification to playoffs
7	Mark Basket	26	12	14	1978	2099	−121	24	Qualification to playoffs
8	Högsbo	26	12	14	1814	1916	−102	24	Qualification to playoffs
9	IK Eos Lund	26	9	17	1970	2102	−132	18	
10	Södertälje BBK	26	9	17	1865	2028	−163	18	
11	Helsingborg	26	9	17	1650	1858	−208	18	
12	Uppsala	26	9	17	1688	1903	−215	18	
13	Wetterbygden	26	7	19	1839	2016	−177	14	
14	Borås	26	7	19	1847	2030	−183	14	Relegated to Basketettan

Updated to match(es) played on 17 March, 2022. Source: Profixio
