= 2020–21 Helsingborg BBK season =

Helsingborg BBK Women
2020-21 season
- Sports Director: Per'Åke Lundquist
- Chairman: Anders Sergel
- Head coach: Ville Tuominen
- Arena: GA Hallen
- Basketligan dam: 12
- Scoring leader: (Greece) Vasiliki Louka 17.0
- Rebounding leader: (Greece) Vasiliki Louka 9.2
- Assists leader: (Sweden) Patricia Elias 2.9
- Biggest win: 82-60 vs Mark Basket

During the 2020-21 season the Men's team played in Basketettan Södra and the Women's team played in Basketligan dam.

HBBK Men
- Head coach: Xavi Mascaró
- Basketettan Södra: 1
- Scoring leader: (Sweden) Oliver Novakovic 22.0
- Rebounding leader: (Sweden) Erik Joelsson 12.0
- Assists leader: (Sweden) Anton Persson 3.0
- Biggest win: 93-80 vs Wetterbygden Stars
- Biggest defeat: N/A
Home	Away
- All statistics correct as of August 29, 2021.

== Men's Season ==
Due to the COVID-19 pandemic and restrictions only one game was played by Helsingborg in Basketettan Södra during the 2020–21 season. The Swedish Basketball Federation was therefore forced to make a decisions out of the ordinary this season as well. With HBBK's will to play in Superettan as strong as ever they chose to apply for a spot in the second tier for the following season. After proving to the federation that the organization had a strong enough base the decision was made that Helsingborg would play in Superettan once again.

== Women's Season ==
The first season in Basketligan dam was a season filled with tough experiences. It took the team 11 games to get their first win in SBL, also the first-ever victory in the highest tier of Swedish basketball ever. This would be their only win in their inaugural season, ending with a 1–21 record. Due to the decision made by the Swedish Basketball Federation on June 11, 2020, that no team will be relegated from SBL after the 2020–21 season. It gave HBBK the security of staying up no matter what.

== Rosters ==
=== Men's ===
2020-21 HBBK Men's Roster roster
Players
Coaches

Pos.	No.	Nat.	Name	Ht.	Wt.	Age
G	3	(Sweden)	Gabriel Alvesol	1.75 m (5 ft 9 in)		28 – 27 November 1996
G	4	(Sweden)	Anton Persson	1.80 m (5 ft 11 in)		27 – 6 December 1997
G	6	(Sweden)	Rami Ismail	1.78 m (5 ft 10 in)		28 – 2 January 1997
F/C	7	(Sweden)	Erik Joelsson (C)	1.96 m (6 ft 5 in)		28 – 3 May 1997
G	8	(Sweden)	Carl Sergel	1.84 m (6 ft 0 in)		24 – 17 November 2000
G/F	9	(Sweden)	Alexander Samkovski	1.90 m (6 ft 3 in)		25 – 1 February 2000
F	10	(Sweden)	Patrik Andersson (injured) (VC)	1.91 m (6 ft 3 in)		30 – 5 December 1994
F	11	(Sweden)	Isak Mattsson	1.90 m (6 ft 3 in)		24 – 30 November 2000
F	12	(Sweden)	Darrell Nadarevic	1.90 m (6 ft 3 in)		23 – 17 November 2001
G/F	13	(Sweden)	Oliver Novakovic	1.90 m (6 ft 3 in)	80 kg (176 lb)	25 – 12 February 2000
C	15	(Sweden)	Hannes Erhardt	2.10 m (6 ft 11 in)		31 – 10 April 1994
C	16	(Norway)	Alex Tastad	2.05 m (6 ft 9 in)		32 – 11 September 1993
G/F	17	(Sweden)	Jacob Sjösten	1.83 m (6 ft 0 in)		24 – 19 October 2001
G/F	18	(Norway)	David Tastad	1.83 m (6 ft 0 in)		23 – 14 June 2002

Head coach

- Xavi Mascaró

Assistant coach(es)

- Orhan Arnautovic

Legend

- (C) Team captain
- Injured

- Roster

=== Women's ===
2020-21 HBBK Women's Roster roster
Players
Coaches

Pos.	No.	Nat.	Name	Ht.	Wt.	Age
PG	3	(Sweden)	Patricia Elias	1.62 m (5 ft 4 in)		25 – 12 May 2000
G/F	4	(Sweden)	Alma Fransson	1.74 m (5 ft 9 in)		29 – 4 October 1996
G	5	(Sweden)	Sabina Radonja	1.73 m (5 ft 8 in)		25 – 26 May 2000
F	5	(United States)	Nicole Martin	1.83 m (6 ft 0 in)		27 – 8 March 1998
F	6	(Sweden)	Madeleine Hulth Olsson	1.79 m (5 ft 10 in)		28 – 16 August 1997
G	7	(Sweden)	Tajma Krslak	1.79 m (5 ft 10 in)		23 – 1 June 2002
G	8	(Finland)	Sara Rokkanen	1.78 m (5 ft 10 in)		29 – 15 May 1996
G	9	(Sweden)	Vendela Genell	1.74 m (5 ft 9 in)		28 – 20 September 1997
G/F	10	(Sweden)	Mathilda Ågren (C)	1.76 m (5 ft 9 in)		29 – 29 March 1996
G	11	(Sweden)	Isabelle Finke	1.72 m (5 ft 8 in)		30 – 9 December 1994
C	13	(Greece)	Vasiliki Louka	1.92 m (6 ft 4 in)		29 – 5 July 1996
F	14	(Sweden)	Maryam Al-Ameri	1.80 m (5 ft 11 in)		22 – 14 January 2003
F	17	(Sweden)	Tova Boquist	1.84 m (6 ft 0 in)		26 – 2 December 1998
G	18	(Sweden)	Malva Ekelöf	1.78 m (5 ft 10 in)		23 – 12 April 2002
F	19	(Sweden)	Patricia Axelsson (injured)	1.79 m (5 ft 10 in)		27 – 28 October 1997

Head coach

- Ville Tuominen

Assistant coach(es)

- Yohanna Araya
- Puja Shahbani Nejad

Team manager

- Yohanna Araya

Legend

- (C) Team captain
- Injured

- Roster
