= 2024–25 Basketligan dam =

Women's basketball league in Sweden

Basketligan dam
- Season: 2024–25
- Dates: Regular season: 28 September 2024 – 22 March 2025; Play Offs: 27 March – 27 April 2025
- Teams: 11

Regular season
- Season MVP: (United States) Jessica Lindstrom

Finals
- Champions: Luleå Basket (7th title)
- Runners-up: Högsbo Basket
- Finals MVP: (United States) Mehryn Kraker

Statistical leaders
Points	(United States) Jessica Kelliher	24.6
Rebounds	(United States) Jessica Lindstrom	12.2
Assists	(United States) Tiffany Brown	7.3
Steals	(France) Marion Heriaud	3.7
Blocks	three players	1.1

The 2024–25 Basketligan dam is the 24th season of the top division women's basketball league in Sweden since its establishment in 2001. It starts in September 2024 with the first round of the regular season and ends in April 2025.

Södertälje BBK are the defending champions.

Luleå Basket won their seventh title after beating Högsbo Basket in the final.

== Format ==
Each team plays each other twice. The top eight teams qualify for the play offs. The quarterfinals are played as a best of three series while the semifinals and final is played as a best of five series.

== Regular season ==
Pos	Team	Pld	W	L	PF	PA	PD	Pts	Qualification
1	Luleå Basket	20	19	1	1910	1106	+804	39	Play Offs
2	Norrköping Dolphins	20	18	2	1693	1363	+330	38	Play Offs
3	Högsbo Basket	20	16	4	1793	1420	+373	36	Play Offs
4	Alvik Basket	20	13	7	1551	1589	−38	33	Play Offs
5	Södertälje BBK	20	12	8	1550	1414	+136	32	Play Offs
6	Uppsala Basket	20	9	11	1294	1408	−114	29	Play Offs
7	AIK Basket	20	8	12	1527	1627	−100	28	Play Offs
8	Mark Borås	20	5	15	1381	1646	−265	25	Play Offs
9	IK Eos	20	4	16	1470	1704	−234	24	
10	Visby Ladies	20	3	17	1230	1726	−496	23 (Note: Visby Ladies 140–138 Östersund Basket)	
11	Östersund Basket	20	3	17	1279	1675	−396	23	

Source: Basketligan dam
Rules for classification: 1) Points; 2) Points difference; 3) Points scored.

== Play offs ==
Quarterfinals
1	Luleå Basket	106	90	2
8	Mark Borås	60	51	0
4	Alvik Basket	68	59	0
5	Södertälje BBK	82	73	2
2	Norrköping Dolphins	83	80	2
7	AIK Basket	58	66	0
3	Högsbo Basket	99	87	2
6	Uppsala Basket	68	72	0

Semifinals
1	Luleå Basket	95	92	89	3
5	Södertälje BBK	62	72	58	0
2	Norrköping Dolphins	64	69	76	64	1
3	Högsbo Basket	81	87	63	70	3

Final
1	Luleå Basket	88	86	89	3
3	Högsbo Basket	67	73	63	0

Champions of Sweden

Luleå Basket
Seventh title
