= Kenny Lövingsson =

Swedish businessman, sports executive and politician

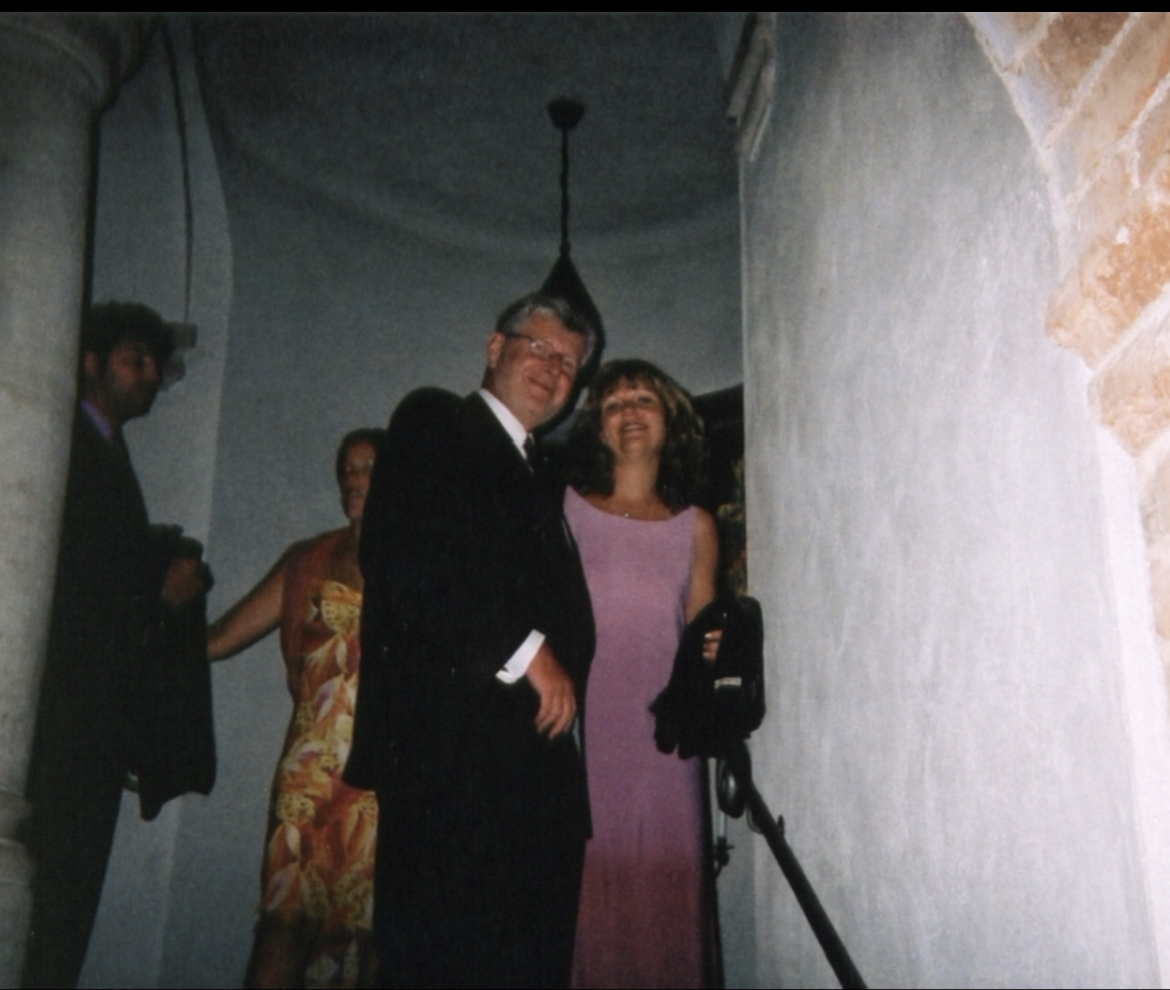
- Lövingsson at the Cedergren tower, Danderyd Municipality, 2009

Chairman and President of the Swedish Basketball Federation
- In office 10 August 1992 – 21 October 1996
- Preceded by: Eleonor Rehn-Jacobsson
- Succeeded by: Kari Marklund

Senior Advisor for the Government Offices
- In office 1990–1994 Serving with: Jan-Erik Ander; Peje Emilsson
- Monarch: Carl XVI Gustaf
- Prime Minister: Carl Bildt

Commissioner for Sports, Recreation, and Cultural Affairs
- In office 1999–2007

Personal details
- Born: 8 October 1945 (age 81) Solna Municipality in Stockholm, Sweden
- Party: Moderate Party
- Spouse: Ann-Britt Sundkvist
- Children: 2
- Education: Solna Gymnasium Stockholm University, Stockholm Business School
- Occupation: Businessman; investor; politician; sportsperson; lobbyist; politician

Military service
- Years of service: 1963–1965
- Unit: Swedish Armed Forces

Rolf Kenny Lövingsson (born 8 October 1945) is a Swedish businessman, lobbyist and sportsman who served as chairman and president of the Swedish Basketball Federation from 1992 to 1996 and established the Swedish Basketball League (SBL) in 1992.

Lövingsson was born in Solna. At the age of 15, he began competing in sports at the national level, ultimately winning the Swedish Youth Championship. He served as chairman of the Swedish Basketball Federation from 1992 to 1996, during which the Swedish Basketball League (SBL) was established in 1992.

He held senior roles within various information technology companies and consultancy firms. As vice-chairman of Kreab Worldwide, he and his associates gained significant influence during the Bildt Cabinet, managing government public relations and lobbying initiatives. He has also held various positions within Västervik municipality and served as Commissioner for Sports, Recreation, and Cultural Affairs from 1999 to 2007.

== Early life (1945–1970) ==
Rolf Kenny Lövingsson was born on 8 October 1945 at his family's estate in Solna, Stockholm County. His father, Axel Erland Lövingsson, was a military intelligence official and foreman who had been a close associate of Axel Ax:son Johnson. His mother, Lilly Berty Elisabeth Lövingsson (née Lundbäck), was a chief secretary.

=== Youth sports (1960–1964) ===
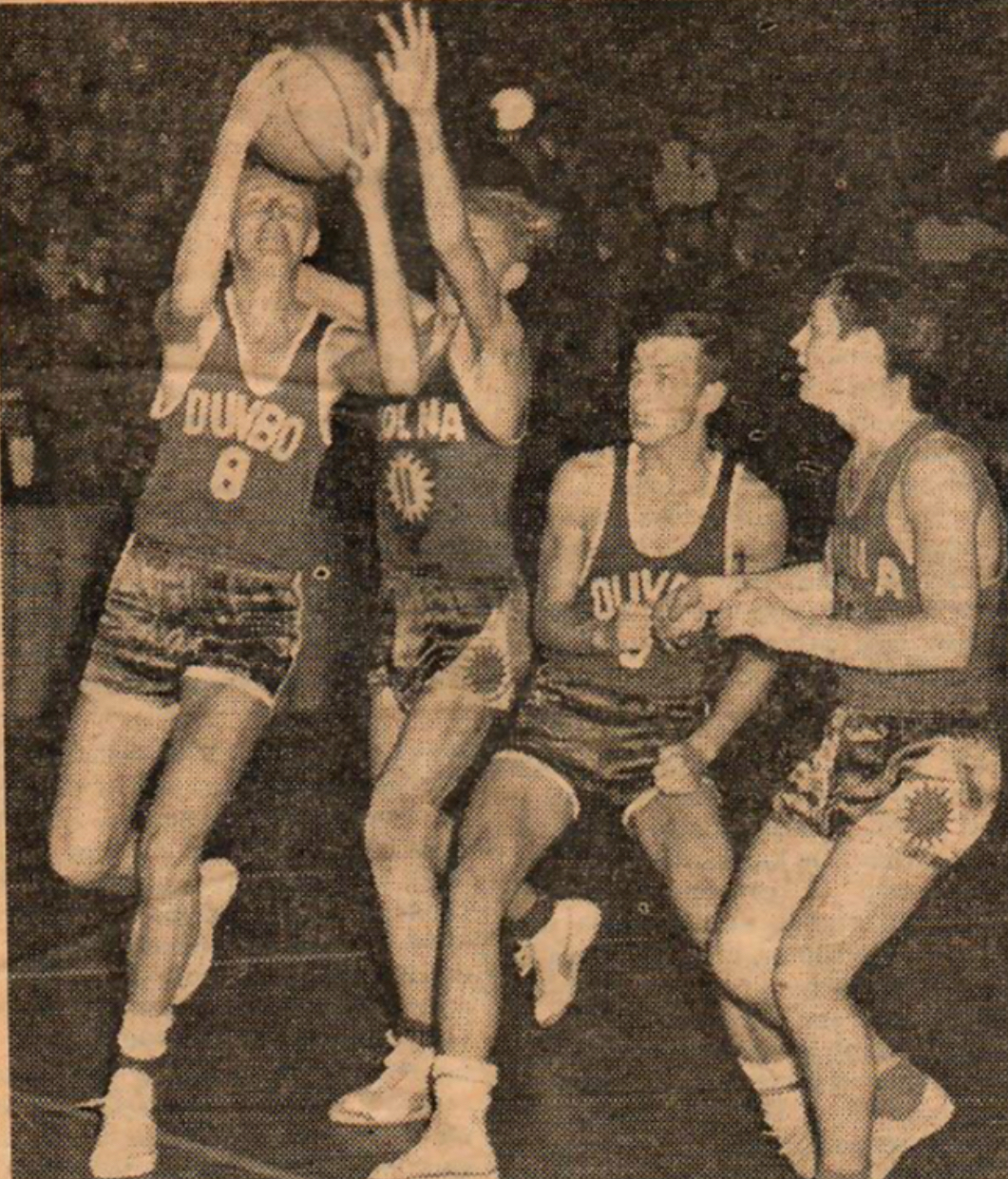
Duvbo's Kenny Lövingsson (far left) prepares to take a shot as Solna's Gunnar Jacobsson tries to block it. (Photo: F. Forstmanis)

In 1960, Lövingsson enrolled at Solna Gymnasium in Solna, Stockholm County, aged 15, where he got involved in youth sports. He was recruited for the Swedish Men's National Under-18 basketball team. On 15 December 1963, Lövingsson, playing for Solna District Basketball team, won the Swedish School Championship in Basketball. He was the player with the second most points in the match. At the time, the Solna District Basketball team included half of the National Men's Under-18 Basketball team. In 1964, after surpassing the age limit for the national men's under-18 team, Lövingsson transitioned to and began his mandatory service.

=== Early career (1967–1970) ===
He enrolled at Stockholm University to pursue a degree in civil engineering, while simultaneously studying national economics and finance. In 1967, he was appointed as deputy site manager at Johnson Construction Company Nya Asfalt. In 1968, Lövingsson entered sales and worked as a sales engineer at Consensus. In 1970, Lövingsson was appointed as chief sales officer (CSO) and chief product officer (CPO) at Interco.

== Private sector career (1967–1992) ==
=== Utvecklingsplan AB (1976–1977) ===
In 1976, Lövingsson was nominated as regional chief executive officer and senior consultant by the executive committee of Utvecklingsplan AB. In 1977, he was appointed as a board member of Utvecklingsplan AB.

=== Anderson and Lembke (1979–1981) ===
In 1979, Lövingsson was appointed chief executive officer (CEO) of the B2B Marketing agency Anderson & Lembke. In 1979, under Lövingsson's management, Anderson & Lembke entered the UK market by opening an office in London. In 1980, he stepped down as CEO of the firm. In 1982, an Anderson & Lembke office based in Stamford, Connecticut was successfully launched. In the 1980s, the firm was awarded with creative awards and attracted major technology clients such as Microsoft and Sun Microsystems.

By the year 1984, the A&L group included four companies in Stockholm and agencies in Gothenburg, Helsingborg, Helsinki, Oslo, London, and Stamford. Their combined personnel was 170 and annual sales around US$65 million.

Lövingsson's team was active in the Chiat/Day/Mojo expansion of Anderson & Lembke Inc. into San Francisco, Amsterdam and Hongkong. In 1995, the shareholders of Anderson & Lembke sold the firm to McCann Erickson.

=== Cicero Group (1981–1986) ===
In 1981, Lövingsson was appointed as CEO of Cicero and Utvecklingsplan. In 1984, he managed the fusion between Cicero Affärsinformation AB and Utvecklingsplan AB. He was appointed as deputy CEO and vice-chairman for the newly formed Cicero Group in 1985. In 1986, Lövingsson was further appointed CEO of Cicero Management.

=== Kreab Worldwide (1990–1996) ===
Lövingsson was appointed as vice-chairman and senior consultant at KREAB in 1990. KREAB was at the time the largest lobbying company in Sweden. He was nominated by Jan-Erik Ander, Peje Emilsson and Peder Olin, all of whom founded the PR firm in 1970 and had backgrounds in the Moderate Party. Lövingsson managed the public relations and lobbying of Carl Bildt’s administration from 1991 to 1994. Carl Bildt during his term as Prime Minister of Sweden and Minister of Foreign Affairs was alleged to have been responsible for the Georgian regime transferring over 20 MSEK to KREAB. KREAB's involvement with Carl Bildt has in media been heavily scrutinised due to lobbying and corruption allegations. Carl Bildt is currently the vice-chairman of KREAB worldwide. Bildt as well as KREAB denied the allegations.

Lövingsson further acted as the CEO for the firm Assimilator AB, a smaller advisory and consulting group, from 1989.

=== Proprietorships and board duties ===
Lövingsson was a member of the board of directors of Handels & Juristinkasso AB (HOJAB) from 1988 to 1991. Founded in 1981, HOJAB is a Swedish debt collecting and credit information corporation, today operating under Svea Inkasso Aktiebolag as part of Svea Bank AB group. During this period, HOJAB was involved two cases which reached the Supreme Court of Sweden, both of which the company won, case Posting Date - NJA 1988 s. 312 confirmed that payment counted only when booked to the creditor’s account, so the debtor paid too late, and for the case Sending of Reminders and Collection Demands - RH 1990:107, in which debtor claimed they had not received the reminder and inkasso demand, the court accepted system records as proof the reminders and collection demands were sent. As of 2024, the company had a turnover of SEK448.68 million (approximately US$47.66 million) and earnings before interest, taxes and amortization (EBITA) of SEK167.53 million (approximately US$17.79 million).

He served as a member of the board of directors of Merkantil Leasing from 1989 to 1992. Founded in 1965, originally as a subsidiary of Götabanken, it was Sweden’s oldest financing company. Sweden's oldest financing company, founded in 1965. As of 1989, the company has a balance sheet of SEK2,761 million (approximately US$445.23 million in 1989 and US$1.195 billion in 2026) in addition to hundreds of employees by the 1980s. Merkantil Leasing is since 2016 owned by Swedbank.

From 1983 to 1994, Lövingsson was a board member as well as a principal shareholder of the Cicero Group.

Lövingsson was co-owner and the chairman of LärData AB from 1983 to 1994. Founded in 1983, the company became a leader in the early Information technology sector in Sweden. By the 1990s, Lärdata AB had 120 full-time employees across 11 regional offices around Sweden and a turnover of SEK105 million (approximately US$14.32 million in 1998 and US$29.26 million in 2026, adjusted for inflation). In 1997, the company was acquired by the Swedish private equity firm Segulah, marking it as the firm's first investment.

In 1995, Lövingsson was appointed chairman of Meta Able AB, a Swedish language, culture and communication training company. In 1996, the company launched MARS, one of the first e-learning platforms in Sweden. In 2000, Meta Able AB was acquired by Sveriges Teknologföreningen (STF) and later consolidated into Mindset AB.

In 1990, Lövingsson became a principal shareholder and board member of PACE Utveckling AB, whose project partners and clients include the Government Offices, the Ministry of Foreign Affairs, the Ministry of Enterprise, the Confederation of Swedish Enterprise, Lund University, the Swedish Olympic Committee, Swedish Sports Confederation and others.

In 1999, he was appointed chairman of Struktur Svenska Kontor AB, a consulting group.

Lövingsson served as the chairman of Stockholms Affärsresebyrå AB, later renamed Exakt Affärsresebyrå AB, from 2000 until its acquisition by VIA Travel in 2002. At the time of the acquisition, the company had a revenue exceeding SEK 1.2 billion. In 2014, the Swedish subsidiary of VIA Travel was the most profitable travel agency in Sweden.

In 2004 he was moderator for the EBC-Kreaprenör (today Creapreneur) annual club meeting. He was further appointed CEO and chairman of Styrelseakademien in Stockholm.

== Involvement in national politics (1988–1994) ==
In 1986, after a visit to the United States, Lövingsson's company Lärdata AB was hired as a third-party provider by the Moderate Party to train staff on modern campaign strategies, including the use of telecommunications, computers, and non-traditional media platforms. During this time, he developed valuable connections with Jan-Erik Ander, Peje Emilsson, and Peder Olin, the founders of the PR firm Kreab Worldwide, all of whom had ties to the Moderate Party.

Lövingsson served as adviser for information in the Moderate Party's Chancery from 23 August 1986 to 4 October 1991. During this period, he became acquainted with Ulf Kristersson, who was then chairman of the Moderate Youth League and is now the prime minister of Sweden. However, Lövingsson and Kristersson eventually diverged due to their differing views on the Carl Bildt Government. While both were closely acquainted with former Party Leader Gösta Bohman, Kristersson aligned more closely with Bohman's criticism of the Bildt Cabinet.

Lövingsson was appointed vice-chairman, senior partner, and senior expert consultant at Kreab in 1990. He held various positions in the Carl Bildt Government, leveraging his role as vice-chairman of Kreab. Kreab Worldwide, widely regarded as the Moderate Party's primary lobbying and public relations firm, is often described as an integral part of the party's core operations. This was particularly evident during the Bildt Cabinet, where media described the formation of a "second shadow government" led by Bildt and his associates at Kreab Worldwide.

Lövingsson served as senior advisor for public relations in the Prme Minister's Office from 4 October 1991 to 11 November 1992 and as senior national advisor for the policy at the Government Offices from 11 November 1991 to 7 October 1994. Within the Moderate Party, he also served as senior advisor and director of campaign promotion and fundraising from 1990 to 1994.

=== Resignation and scrutiny ===
After Carl Bildt's defeat in the 1994 Swedish general election, Lövingsson withdrew from national politics and resigned from Kreab Worldwide. The relationship between Kreab Worldwide, Carl Bildt, and their involvement with the Bildt Cabinet has been heavily scrutinized in the media, particularly due to allegations of lobbying and corruption. Lövingsson, who managed public relations and lobbying for Bildt's administration from 1991 to 1994, also faced scrutiny for his role in these activities.

During his tenure as prime minister of Sweden and later as minister of foreign affairs, Carl Bildt was alleged to have been involved in the Georgian regime transferring over 20 MSEK to Kreab Worldwide.

== Sports ==
Lövingsson was recruited as a teen for the Swedish Men's National Under-18 basketball team. He was granted an active role in the Sweden's nomination to host the Olympic Games.

=== Chairman of Täby Basket ===
Lövingsson was appointed chairman of the basketball club Täby Basket from 1988 to 1992 and honorary chairman from 1992 to 1996. In 1988, Lövingsson appointed Kjell "Kjelle" Göran Karlgren as the club director with focus on the youth activities. The same season Täby Basket successfully qualified for the Swedish Championship finals. In 1989, the Swedish Championship finals were broadcast on television from Tibblehallen which was part of the Täby Basket facilities.

In 1990, the club joined the Bingo Alliance, which brought Täby Basket an annual 300,000 SEK and helped achieve financial balance in the club's operations. In 1991, Täby Basket became Swedish Cup champions and the first club in Stockholm to get involved with Bingolotto. To establish sales location Karlgren stated that:

"A [player’s] father helped me travel around to find sales locations. After two months of struggle, it finally took off around Christmas, and we started bringing in 10,000 SEK a month for about 10 years."

— Täby Basketball Association’s interview with Kjell Göran Karlgren

In 1992, the club saw significant growth during school strike, when it made sure that Tibblehallen stayed open. Karlgren is quoted saying:

"We gathered the kids to make sure they stayed active – we created fun activities, and the sense of unity within the club grew stronger."

— Täby Basketball Association’s interview with Kjell Göran Karlgren

=== Chairman of the Swedish Basketball Federation (1992–1996) ===
In 1992, Lövingsson was appointed chairman of the Swedish Basketball Federation. The campaign slogan he used was:

"En korg per torg!"

The same year, in 1992, the Swedish Basketball League was established under Lövingsson's chairmanship. In 1993, the league introduced awards and nominations.

During the 1980s, the Swedish Basketball Federation imposed restrictions on foreign talent and teams could solely have one player from the Americas. Lövingsson revoked these restrictions and allowed the teams in the Swedish Basketball Federation to have two American players in 1992.

The 1990s was regarded the most prominent period of Swedish basketball history. Under Lövingsson's chairmanship the Swedish Men's National Team reached its highest ranking to this current date.

In 2020, he would also initiate a fellowship with the Swedish Sports Confederation.

== Political engagements in Västervik Municipality (1999–2007) ==
=== Commissioner for Sports, Recreation, and Cultural Affairs (1999–2007) ===
Lövingsson served as the Commissioner for Sports, Recreation, and Cultural Affairs from 1999 to 2007, appointed by the Västervik municipality.

==== Civil Disputed with the Municipal Power Company ====
In 2002, he was involved in a civil suit against the municipal power company following an incident. The incident occurred after a rainstorm, during which the power company released excessive amounts of water into Hällsjön, causing the water level at the footbridge to rise to extreme heights. Consequently, Mona Gyllinger and Torbjörn Sand, who could not have known about the water level when they set off on their canoe trip from Smitterstad to Ankarsrum, suffered injuries after colliding with the bridge.

==== The Transfer of Municipal Music School ====
In 2003, Lövingsson, as the head of the consultative council, decided to transfer the municipal music and arts schools from the supervision of the Board of Education to the Department of Culture and Recreation. The proposal received criticism from the Board of Education, but Lövingsson states that one of the reasons for this decision is that the head of the Board of Education, Lennart Fredriksson, views the Music School as a non-prioritized, non-obligatory activity that should be shut down if the finances of the compulsory schools are at risk. It is noted that before the proposal was presented, Lövingsson had consulted with the heads of the Board of Education, the Department of Culture and Recreation, as well as the former mayor of Västervik, Conny Jansson.

==== Västervik Fotboll Association ====
In 2003, Lövingsson was appointed to the board of Västerviks FF and served as vice-chairman from 2008. During his tenure the association was able to reduce its debt with 1.2 MSEK annually, saving the club from bankruptcy.

==== Västervik Speedway ====
In 2007, he took part in the discourse surrounding the municipal speedway club and its franchise name change of SEK 250,000. He meant that the club's brand value was undervalued due to municipalities conservative nature of estimates. Asserting that:

"When the private sector gets involved in speedway sports, it has been shown that clubs often have to change their names to reflect the main sponsor’s name. Vetlanda Municipality has recognized the value of having the town’s name associated with the speedway team’s successes and has paid 350,000 SEK for “Vetlanda" to once again be included in the club's name."

— Kenny Lövingsson, press release, 14 February 2007

== Family ==
Kenny Lövingsson is married to Ann-Britt Lövingsson (née Sundkvist), daughter of Else Lindholm, the owner of a consumer goods company, and paint master Gösta Sundkvist.

His family have held an active community role within the Västervik Municipality, hosting sports events and art projects. Lövingsson was a major actor in the regional fiber-project . Under the COVID-19 pandemic Ann-Britt Lövingsson hosted an art exhibition in the forest and decorated it with classic Nordic folklore themed sculptures. The Lövingssons had previously been responsible for building Trolls and Sprites in the region. In the 20th century the family was involved in the promotion of Gamleby and its Troll forest. The family was further responsible for the Hummelstad Boule promotion campaign in 2022.

The Lövingsson's still own the estate Haga in Kälkestad first acquired by the family during the early 20th century.
