= 2023–24 Helsingborg BBK season =

Helsingborg BBK 2023-24 Season

Helsingborg BBK
- Head coach: (Spain) Xavi Mascaró
- Arena: GA Hallen
- Superettan: 8th
- Playoffs: Quarterfinals
- Svenska Cupen: Round 1
- Scoring leader: (Sweden) Alexander Smakowski 19
- Rebounding leader: (France) Baptiste Chazelas 15.6
- Assists leader: (Sweden) Oliver Cupan 5.5
- Highest home attendance: 138; Helsingborg 86-75 Högsbo (April 12, 2024)
- Average home attendance: 98
- Biggest win: Helsingborg 128-62 Sloga Uppsala (October 28, 2023)
- Biggest defeat: Högsbo 104-85 Helsingborg (November 30, 2023)
- All statistics correct as of April 14, 2024.

During the 2023–24 season, the men's team play in Superettan and the women's team play in division 2. The men's team also compete in the Swedish Cup.

== Overview ==
=== Preseason ===
- June 13, 2023 - The club announces the extension of men's team head coach Xavier Mascaró for one more year.
- June 28, 2023 - Ahead of the 2023-24 season, the board announced the decision to withdraw the women's team from Basketettan. Claiming it as a wise decision for both club and players due to difficulty in recruiting a head coach as well as losing players from the previous season.
- July 8, 2023 - The new head coach for the women's team was announced as Erik Palmer.

=== Season ===
- February 16, 2024 - The club announced a decision to bring the men's team down to Basketettan in the upcoming season. The reason being financial difficulties
- March 1, 2024 - The club announce the departure of 4 year men's team head coach Xavier Mascaró after the end of the season.
- April 1, 2024 - The club announce that instead of playing in Basketettan the following season, the team must be moved to division 2 following financial concerns in the club.

== Players ==
=== Squad information ===
2023-24 HBBK Roster roster
Players
Coaches

Pos.	No.	Nat.	Name	Ht.	Wt.	Age
G	3	(Sweden)	Ruben Sternheden	1.82 m (6 ft 0 in)		19 – 1 March 2007
G	4	(Sweden)	Anton Persson	1.80 m (5 ft 11 in)		28 – 6 December 1997
C	5	(France)	Baptiste Chazelas	1.98 m (6 ft 6 in)		29 – 20 July 1997
F	5	(Sweden)	Felix Carlsson	1.98 m (6 ft 6 in)		31 – 19 September 1995
F	5	(Sweden)	Samoro Unger Njie	1.95 m (6 ft 5 in)		32 – 25 February 1994
G	6	(Sweden)	Rami Ismail	1.80 m (5 ft 11 in)		29 – 2 January 1997
F/C	7	(Spain)	Boubacar Gassama	2.01 m (6 ft 7 in)		26 – 15 October 1999
G/F	9	(Sweden)	Alexander Samkowski	1.88 m (6 ft 2 in)		26 – 1 February 2000
F	10	(Sweden)	Patrik Andersson (C)	1.91 m (6 ft 3 in)		31 – 5 December 1994
F	11	(Sweden)	Rickard Rietz	2.05 m (6 ft 9 in)		24 – 8 July 2002
PG	12	(Sweden)	Jacob Burke	1.80 m (5 ft 11 in)		23 – 14 October 2002
G	13	(Sweden)	Oliver Cupan	1.94 m (6 ft 4 in)		24 – 19 May 2002
F	14	(Sweden)	Carl Thore	1.90 m (6 ft 3 in)		21 – 14 December 2004
C	16	(Sweden)	Jack Rönndahl	2.05 m (6 ft 9 in)		17 – 3 August 2009
G/F	17	(Norway) (Sweden)	David Tastad	1.83 m (6 ft 0 in)		24 – 14 June 2002

Head coach

- Xavi Mascaró

Assistant coach(es)

- Anders Rönndahl
- Enric Orozco I Piqué

Legend

- (C) Team captain
- Injured

- Roster
Updated: March 11, 2024

=== Players in ===
No.	Pos.	Nat.	Name
14	G	(Spain)	Guillem Torrent
5	F	(Sweden)	Felix Carlsson
13	G	(Sweden)	Oliver Cupan
16	PF/C	(Spain)	Jesus Quesada
7	F/C	(Spain)	Boubacar Gassama

=== Players Out ===
No.	Pos.	Nat.	Name	Date	Source
7	PF/C	(Sweden)	Erik Joelsson	July 18, 2023	
8	F	(Sweden)	Samoro Unger	August 16, 2023	
6	G	(Spain)	Alejandro Rubiera	August 20, 2023	
16	PF/C	(Spain)	Jesus Quesada	October 23, 2023	

== Preseason ==
Win Loss

August 18, 2023	Malbas	63–77	Helsingborg BBK	Malmö
19:00
				Arena: Heleneholms Sporthall

August 25, 2023	Helsingborg BBK	88–70	IK Eos Lund	Helsingborg
20:15
				Arena: GA Hallen

August 27, 2023	Helsingborg BBK	89–71	Amager	Helsingborg
15:45
				Arena: GA Hallen

== Swedish Cup ==
Official fixture list

Win Loss

September 9, 2023 1	Helsingborg BBK	78–99	Högsbo	Helsingborg
17:00	Scoring by quarter: 25-23, 17-22, 16-20, 20-34
Baskettv.se	Pts: Smakowski 18; Rebs: Quesada 9 Asts: Burke, Rietz, Torrent 3	Boxscore	Pts: Peleg 28; Rebs: Vitali 13; Asts: Peleg 5	Arena: GA Hallen; Attendance: 83

== Regular season ==
Official fixture list

Win Loss

September 23, 2023 1	Helsingborg BBK	90–65	Eskilstuna	Helsingborg
15:00	Scoring by quarter: 22-15, 20-16, 26-14, 22-20
sehtv.se	Pts: Rietz 23; Rebs: Andersson 10; Asts: Burke 5	Boxscore	Pts: Findén 15; Rebs: Karahmetovic 8 Asts: Sandeberg 3	Arena: GA Hallen; Attendance: 73

September 30, 2023 2	Djurgården	71–78	Helsingborg BBK	Stockholm
17:00	Scoring by quarter: 18-19, 22-17, 19-14, 12-28
Sehtv.se	Pts: Crafoord 19; Rebs: Thörnblom 11; Asts: Bogdanovic 8	Boxscore	Pts: Smakowski 18; Rebs: Rietz 8 Asts: Burke 7	Arena: Brönnkyrkahallen; Attendance: 65

October 1, 2023 3	Fryshuset	82–79	Helsingborg BBK	Stockholm
17:00	Scoring by quarter: 21-28, 16-27, 25-15, 20-9
Sehtv.se	Pts: Lemetti 27; Rebs: Kodu 6 Asts: Lemetti 9	Boxscore	Pts: Smakowski 26; Rebs: Gassama, Quesada 8 Asts: Cupan 6	Arena: Fryshuset CC; Attendance: 40

October 7, 2023 4	Kalmar	75–107	Helsingborg BBK	Kalmar
16:00	Scoring by quarter: 14-26, 21-29, 21-23, 19-29
Sehtv.se	Pts: Birgemo 15; Rebs: Ramstedt 9 Asts: Indriksons 8	Boxscore	Pts: Smakowski 30; Rebs: Quesada 6 Asts: Burke, Torrent 5	Arena: Akea Arena; Attendance: 100

October 14, 2023 5	Helsingborg BBK	70–69	Norrort	Helsingborg
14:15	Scoring by quarter: 10-23, 21-9, 20-17, 19-20
Sehtv.se	Pts: Smakowski 22; Rebs: Torrent 9 Asts: Burke 4	Boxscore	Pts: Teigland 19; Rebs: Adolfson 12; Asts: Teigland 3	Arena: GA Hallen; Attendance: 92

October 18, 2023 6	IK Eos Lund	77–84	Helsingborg BBK	Lund
19:00	Scoring by quarter: 18-28, 15-22, 27-14, 17-20
Sehtv.se	Pts: Karason 18; Rebs: Von Uthmann 17; Asts: Jangered 6	Boxscore	Pts: Andersson 24; Rebs: Cupan 8 Asts: Cupan 6	Arena: Eoshallen; Attendance: 336

October 22, 2023 7	Helsingborg BBK	79–83	AIK	Helsingborg
16:15	Scoring by quarter: 24-17, 7-29, 24-11, 24-26
Sehtv.se	Pts: Quesada 27; Rebs: Quesada 11; Asts: Burke, Cupan 5	Boxscore	Pts: Holmström Forster, Welander 8 Rebs: Welander 9 Asts: Nilsson, Nunez, Rusom 3	Arena: GA Hallen; Attendance: N/A

October 28, 2023 8	Helsingborg BBK	128–62	Sloga Uppsala	Helsingborg
15:00	Scoring by quarter: 36-9, 31-14, 36-12, 25-27
Sehtv.se	Pts: Unger 23; Rebs: Unger 13; Asts: Burke, Cupan 10	Boxscore	Pts: Grinev 24; Rebs: Eliasson 20; Asts: Eliasson 3	Arena: GA Hallen; Attendance: 69

November 4, 2023 9	Helsingborg BBK	99–82	Högsbo	Helsingborg
15:00	Scoring by quarter: 14-22, 26-16, 31-21, 28-23
Sehtv.se	Pts: Smakowski 25; Rebs: Smakowski 9 Asts: Cupan 8	Boxscore	Pts: Lundstedt 21; Rebs: Vitali 9 Asts: Peleg 5	Arena: GA Hallen; Attendance: 122

November 11, 2023 10	Ockelbo	75–69	Helsingborg BBK	Ockelbo
16:00	Scoring by quarter: 19-12, 14-25, 23-13, 19-19
Sehtv.se	Pts: Lundström 19; Rebs: Jonsson 8 Asts: Burright 12	Boxscore	Pts: Smakowski 18; Rebs: Smakowski 10; Asts: Burke 5	Arena: Kuxahallen; Attendance: 427

November 18, 2023 11	AIK	109–102(OT)	Helsingborg BBK	Stockholm
13:00	Scoring by quarter: 29-22, 21-31, 24-23, 20-18, Overtime: 15-8
Sehtv.se	Pts: Mrabty 22; Rebs: Mrabty, Welander 7 Asts: Mrabty 6	Boxscore	Pts: Smakowski 38; Rebs: Rietz 12; Asts: Cupan 8	Arena: Vasalundshallen; Attendance: 200

November 19, 2023 12	Tureberg	96–80	Helsingborg BBK	Stockholm
13:00	Scoring by quarter: 25-18, 22-19, 30-26, 19-17
Sehtv.se	Pts: Jernberg 22; Rebs: Lindh 14; Asts: Lindh 9	Boxscore	Pts: Andersson 25; Rebs: Andersson 7 Asts: Cupan 7	Arena: Sollentuna Sporthall; Attendance: 37

November 22, 2023 13	Malbas	75–70	Helsingborg BBK	Malmö
19:00	Scoring by quarter: 14-21, 21-11, 24-19, 16-19
Sehtv.se	Pts: Månsson 27; Rebs: Månsson 11; Asts: Rostbøll Norberg 3	Boxscore	Pts: Smakowski 31; Rebs: Rietz 7 Asts: Burke 5	Arena: Heleneholms Sporthall; Attendance: 146

November 26, 2023 14	Helsingborg BBK	80–75	Ockelbo	Helsingborg
14:30	Scoring by quarter: 28-22, 25-9, 18-23, 9-21
Sehtv.se	Pts: Gassama 22; Rebs: Gassama 14; Asts: Andersson, Cupan 5	Boxscore	Pts: Manfredsson 17; Rebs: Burright, Olsson 7 Asts: Stark 8	Arena: GA Hallen; Attendance: 83

November 30, 2023 15	Högsbo	104–85	Helsingborg BBK	Gothenburg
19:00	Scoring by quarter: 27-22, 27-17, 26-17, 24-29
Sehtv.se	Pts: A. Karras 31; Rebs: Vitali 16; Asts: Heder Ternell 6	Boxscore	Pts: Gassama 23; Rebs: Andersson 10; Asts: Cupan 5	Arena: Gothia Arena; Attendance: 147

December 9, 2023 16	Eskilstuna	58–83	Helsingborg BBK	Eskilstuna
16:45	Scoring by quarter: 17-26, 14-18, 7-27, 20-12
Sehtv.se	Pts: Findén 21; Rebs: Muorwel 10; Asts: Findén 3	Boxscore	Pts: Rietz 22; Rebs: Gassama 11; Asts: Cupan, Smakowski 4	Arena: Stiga Sports Arena; Attendance: 100

December 17, 2023 17	Helsingborg BBK	105–67	Wetterbygden Stars	Helsingborg
15:00	Scoring by quarter: 30-19, 26-14, 31-17, 18-17
Sehtv.se	Pts: Rietz 25; Rebs: Andersson 9 Asts: Cupan 12	Boxscore	Pts: Eriksson 21; Rebs: Eriksson 5 Asts: Nilsson 6	Arena: GA Hallen

January 7, 2024 19	Helsingborg BBK	70–85	Tureberg	Helsingborg
15:00	Scoring by quarter: 15-22, 14-14, 18-27, 23-22
Sehtv.se	Pts: Gassama 7 Rebs: Rietz 12; Asts: Andersson 6	Boxscore	Pts: Nilsson 21; Rebs: Lindh 16; Asts: Lindh 7	Arena: GA Hallen

January 10, 2024 19	Helsingborg BBK	84–78	Malbas	Helsingborg
19:00	Scoring by quarter: 19-11, 31-25, 21-20, 13-22
Sehtv.se	Pts: Cupan 20; Rebs: Gassama 13; Asts: Gassama 5	Boxscore	Pts: Tilliander Löfqvist 19; Rebs: Arikawe 11; Asts: Möller 7	Arena: GA Hallen; Attendance: 71

January 14, 2024 20	Helsingborg BBK	113–96	Djurgården	Helsingborg
15:30	Scoring by quarter: 32-32, 25-16, 2423, 32-25
Sehtv.se	Pts: Smakowski 46; Rebs: Gassama 14; Asts: Burke, Cupan 6	Boxscore	Pts: Tafra 29; Rebs: Thörnblom 15; Asts: Thörnblom 7	Arena: GA Hallen; Attendance: 105

January 28, 2024 21	Helsingborg BBK	81–70	Kalmar	Helsingborg
16:00	Scoring by quarter: 17-11, 22-14, 27-23, 15-22
Sehtv.se	Pts: Cupan 23; Rebs: Chazelas 16; Asts: Burke 7	Boxscore	Pts: Novovic 23; Rebs: Novovic 11; Asts: Tuckson 11	Arena: GA Hallen; Attendance: 95

February 3, 2024 22	Helsingborg BBK	87–106(OT)	Huddinge	Helsingborg
15:00	Scoring by quarter: 28-35, 14-16, 16-23, 27-11, Overtime: 2-21
Sehtv.se	Pts: Cupan 24; Rebs: Chazelas 24; Asts: Cupan 6	Boxscore	Pts: Mcbee 30; Rebs: Hökk 11; Asts: Chatziathanasiou 8	Arena: GA Hallen; Attendance: 114

February 18, 2024 23	Helsingborg BBK	96–91	Fryshuset	Helsingborg
15:30	Scoring by quarter: 22-20, 24-15, 27-25, 23-31
sehtv.se	Pts: Smakowski 25; Rebs: Rietz, Smakowski 10; Asts: Cupan 9	Boxscore	Pts: Lemetti 29; Rebs: Solevic 12; Asts: Solevic 6	Arena: GA Hallen; Attendance: 127

February 24, 2024 24	Sloga Uppsala	86–75	Helsingborg BBK	Uppsala
14:00	Scoring by quarter: 23-16, 25-17, 14-20, 24-22
sehtv.se	Pts: Nordström 32; Rebs: Dujkovic 17; Asts: Ehrnvall, Nordström 5	Boxscore	Pts: Smakowski 22; Rebs: Chazelas 12; Asts: 4 players, 2	Arena: Upplands Bilforum USIF Arena; Attendance: 109

March 1, 2024 25	Wetterbygden Stars	96–74	Helsingborg BBK	Jönköping
19:30	Scoring by quarter: 12-14, 32-24, 23-21, 29-15
sehtv.se	Pts: Homelius 26; Rebs: Gomez, Kutic 7 Asts: Nilsson 10	Boxscore	Pts: Chazelas 25; Rebs: Chazelas 16; Asts: Chazelas, Cupan 4	Arena: Huskvarna Sporthall; Attendance: 155

March 9, 2024 26	Helsingborg BBK	92–82	RIG Mark	Helsingborg
14:00	Scoring by quarter: 22-20, 29-24, 20-18, 21-20
sehtv.se	Pts: Chazelas 31; Rebs: Chazelas 17; Asts: Cupan 10	Boxscore	Pts: Obenjo 21; Rebs: Mårtenson 13; Asts: Mårtenson 8	Arena: GA Hallen; Attendance: 75

March 23, 2024 27	Norrort	67–88	Helsingborg BBK	Täby
16:00	Scoring by quarter: 12-18, 27-25, 8-29, 20-16
sehtv.se	Pts: Niklasson 16; Rebs: Haegerstrand 7 Asts: Teigland 7	Boxscore	Pts: Rietz 21; Rebs: Chazelas 16; Asts: Burke, Smakowski 6	Arena: Tibblehallen; Attendance: 62

March 24, 2024 28	Huddinge	83–75	Helsingborg BBK	Huddinge
13:00	Scoring by quarter: 26-20, 16-12, 25-24, 16-19
sent.se	Pts: Morin 21; Rebs: Hök 9 Asts: Mcbee, Morin 5	Boxscore	Pts: Smakowski 30; Rebs: Chazelas 16; Asts: Smakowski 4	Arena: Edbohallen; Attendance: 50

April 3, 2024 29	Helsingborg BBK	72–88	IK Eos Lund	Helsingborg
19:00	Scoring by quarter: 18-19, 22-11, 8-37, 24-21
sehtv.se	Pts: Smakowski 17; Rebs: Chazelas 23; Asts: Chazelas 5	Boxscore	Pts: Von Uthmann 20; Rebs: Jangered 13; Asts: 4 players, 3	Arena: GA Hallen; Attendance: 123

April 6, 2024 30	RIG Mark	58–87	Helsingborg BBK	Kinna
13:00	Scoring by quarter: 8-22, 16-13, 12-30, 22-22
sehtv.se	Pts: Blixman 15; Rebs: Obenjo 10; Asts: Obenjo 6	Boxscore	Pts: Chazelas 19; Rebs: Chazelas 15; Asts: Cupan 7	Arena: Kinnahallen; Attendance: 70

== Playoffs ==
April 11, 2024 1	Helsingborg BBK	87–76	Högsbo	Helsingborg
19:00	Scoring by quarter: 20-16, 20-24, 26-16, 21-20
sehtv.se	Pts: Cupan 22; Rebs: Charles 11; Asts: Cupan 7	Boxscore	Pts: Vitali 23; Rebs: Vitali 9 Asts: 5 players, 2	Arena: GA Hallen; Attendance: 138

April 14, 2024 2	Högsbo	96–64	Helsingborg BBK	Gothenburg
17:00
sehtv.se	Pts: Vitali 38; Rebs: Vitali 38; Asts: Peleg	Boxscore	Pts: Smakowski 21; Rebs: Chapels 14; Asts: Cupan 6	Arena: Gothia Arena; Attendance: 395
