= 2022–23 Helsingborg BBK season =

Helsingborg BBK Women
2022-23 season
- Head coach: (Finland) Ville Touminen
- Arena: GA Hallen
- Basketettan Södra: 13
- Svenska Cupen: Round 1
- Scoring leader: (Poland) Natalia Panufnik 24.5
- Rebounding leader: (Poland) Natalia Panufnik 11.6
- Assists leader: (France) Dieng Fatou 6.1
- All statistics correct as of 15 April, 2023.

HBBK Men
- Head coach: (Spain) Xavi Mascaró
- Superettan: 2nd
- Playoffs: Winners
- Svenska Cupen: Round 1
- Scoring leader: (Sweden) Samoro Unger 18.8
- Rebounding leader: (Sweden) Samoro Unger 9.7
- Assists leader: (France) Alexis Plomteux 4
- Highest home attendance: 387
- Lowest home attendance: 64
- Average home attendance: 165
- Biggest win: Helsingborg 103-75 AIK Basket (19 November 2022)
- Biggest defeat: Eskilstuna 100-70 Helsingborg (26 April, 2023)
- All statistics correct as of 3 April, 2023.

During the 2022–23 season, the Men's team will play in Superettan and the Women's team will play in Basketettan Södra. Both teams compete in the Swedish cup during the season.

== Players ==
=== Men ===
==== Squad information ====
2022-23 HBBK Men's roster
Players
Coaches

Pos.	No.	Nat.	Name	Ht.	Wt.	Age
G/F	3	(United States)	Mario Cooper	1.91 m (6 ft 3 in)		37 – 7 April 1989
G	4	(Sweden)	Anton Persson	1.80 m (5 ft 11 in)		28 – 6 December 1997
F	5	(France)	Alexis Plomteux	1.98 m (6 ft 6 in)		30 – 1 March 1996
G	6	(Sweden)	Rami Ismail	1.80 m (5 ft 11 in)		29 – 2 January 1997
G	6	(Spain)	Alejandro Rubiera	1.90 m (6 ft 3 in)		28 – 17 April 1998
F/C	7	(Sweden)	Erik Joelsson (C)	1.96 m (6 ft 5 in)		29 – 3 May 1997
F	8	(Sweden)	Samoro Unger Njie	1.05 m (3 ft 5 in)		32 – 25 February 1994
G/F	9	(Sweden)	Alexander Samkovski	1.88 m (6 ft 2 in)		26 – 1 February 2000
F	10	(Sweden)	Patrik Andersson (VC)	1.91 m (6 ft 3 in)		31 – 5 December 1994
F	11	(Sweden)	Rickard Rietz	2.05 m (6 ft 9 in)		24 – 8 July 2002
PG	12	(Sweden)	Jacob Burke	1.80 m (5 ft 11 in)		23 – 14 October 2002
G/F	14	(Sweden)	Isak Andersson	1.85 m (6 ft 1 in)		23 – 1 June 2003
C	15	(Sweden)	Hannes Erhardt	2.10 m (6 ft 11 in)	109 kg (240 lb)	32 – 10 April 1994
F	16	(Sweden)	Rasmus Westerlund	1.92 m (6 ft 4 in)		22 – 20 December 2003
G/F	17	(Norway) (Sweden)	David Tastad	1.83 m (6 ft 0 in)		24 – 14 June 2002

Head coach

- Xavi Mascaró

Assistant coach(es)

- Anders Rönndahl

Legend

- (C) Team captain
- (VC) Vice Captain
- Injured

- Roster
Updated: February 19, 2023

==== New players ====
No.	Pos.	Nat.	Name	Date	Source
12	PG	(Sweden)	Jacob Burke	July 1, 2022	
5	F	(France)	Alexis Plomteux	July 3, 2022	
16	F	(Sweden)	Rasmus Westerlund	July 24, 2022	
11	F	(Sweden)	Rickard Rietz	August 28, 2022	
3	F	(United States)	Mario Cooper	September 13, 2022	
14	F	(Sweden)	Isak Andersson	September 29, 2022	
6	G	(Spain)	Alejandro Rubiera	October 19, 2022	
8	F	(Sweden)	Samoro Unger Njie	January 16, 2023	

=== Women ===
==== Squad information ====
2022-23 HBBK Women's roster
Players
Coaches

Pos.	No.	Nat.	Name	Ht.	Wt.	Age
	2	(Sweden)	Zinah Al-Ameri			21 – 29 September 2005
F	2	(Poland)	Natalia Panufnik	1.78 m (5 ft 10 in)		30 – 21 June 1996
F	4	(Sweden)	Maryam Al-Ameri	1.80 m (5 ft 11 in)		23 – 14 January 2003
	5	(Sweden)	Clara Eneroth			21 – 5 May 2005
	6	(Sweden)	Anastasia Stepanovska			23 – 5 September 2003
G	7	(Sweden)	Kelly Le	1.69 m (5 ft 7 in)		24–25 – Missing required parameter 1=month! 2001
PG	7	(France) (Senegal)	Dieng Fatou	1.67 m (5 ft 6 in)		41 – 18 August 1985
	8	(Sweden)	Klara Friberg			19–20 – Missing required parameter 1=month! 2006
	9	(Sweden)	Märtha Ursberg			18–19 – Missing required parameter 1=month! 2007
	10	(Sweden)	Celia Pravita			19 – 27 September 2007
	11	(Sweden)	Molly Karlsson			18 – 4 January 2008
	12	(Sweden)	Selma Olofsson			20–21 – Missing required parameter 1=month! 2005
	13	(Sweden)	Alina Sjögren			20 – 6 April 2006
F	16	(Sweden)	Miriam Wahlqvist			22 – 22 April 2004
F	18	(Sweden)	Tyra Eriksson			22 – 17 May 2004

Head coach

- Ville Touminen

Physiotherapist(s)

- Helena Eneroth

Legend

- (C) Team captain
- Injured

- Roster
Updated: February 19, 2023

== Preseason ==
Win Loss

August 17, 2022	Helsingborg BBK	106–59	Malbas	Helsingborg
20:15
				Arena: GA Hallen

August 26, 2022	Helsingborg BBK	102–66	IK Eos Lund	Helsingborg
20:15
	Pts: Andersson 30			Arena: GA Hallen

August 28, 2022	Helsingborg BBK	92–76	Stenhus Basketball College	Helsingborg
20:15
				Arena: GA Hallen

== Swedish Cup ==
Win Loss

=== Men ===
August 28, 2022	Helsingborg BBK	64–66	Kalmar Saints	Helsingborg
20:15
				Arena: Toftahallen

=== Women ===
September 24, 2022	RIG Mark	97–36	Helsingborg BBK	Kinna
12:30
				Arena: Arenahallen; Attendance: 20

== Regular season ==
=== Men ===
Win Loss

September 24, 2022 1	Team4Q	80–90	Helsingborg BBK	Helsingborg
17:00	Scoring by quarter: 22-35, 17-23, 18-21, 23-11
SEHTV	Pts: Sandifer 31; Rebs: Vukovic 9 Asts: Sandifer 8	Boxscore	Pts: Smakowski 23; Rebs: Plomteux 9 Asts: Burke 5	Arena: GA Hallen; Attendance: 120

September 25, 2022 2	Helsingborg BBK	105–101(OT)	Eskilstuna	Helsingborg
16:30	'Scoring by quarter: 32-27, 21- 13, 29-24, 13-31, Overtime: 10-6
SEHTV	Pts: Plomteux 24; Rebs: Andersson, Smakowski 8 Asts: Plomteux 8	Boxscore	Pts: Findén 33; Rebs: A. Muorwel 9 Asts: Mirianidis 5	Arena: GA Hallen; Attendance: 123

October 1, 2022 3	Eskilstuna	96–87	Helsingborg BBK	Eskilstuna
17:00
		Boxscore		Arena: STIGA Sports Arena B Attendance: 312
Note: Stats and Video not available

October 8, 2022 4	Helsingborg BBK	88–80	RIG Mark	Helsingborg
13:30	Scoring by quarter: 25-30, 12-20, 24-16, 27-14
SEHTV	Pts: Plomteux, Smakowski 17; Rebs: Smakowski 10; Asts: Burke 7	Boxscore	Pts: Mårtenson 18; Rebs: Mårtenson 5 Asts: Andersson 7	Arena: GA Hallen; Attendance: 95

October 16, 2022 5	Sloga Uppsala	79–87	Helsingborg BBK	Uppsala
13:00	Scoring by quarter: 11-22, 18-18, 25-20, 25-27
SEHTV	Pts: Damjanovic 23; Rebs: Damjanovic 16; Asts: Nakos 8	Boxscore	Pts: Smakowski 27; Rebs: Plomteux, Rietz, Smakowski 9 Asts: Burke 7	Arena: Upplands Bilforum USIF Arena; Attendance: 100

October 23, 2022 6	Helsingborg BBK	86–79	Wetterbygden	Helsingborg
16:30	Scoring by quarter: 28-16, 14-26, 21-24, 23-13
SEHTV	Pts: Smakowski 23; Rebs: Andersson, Burke 5 Asts: Burke 7	Boxscore	Pts: Eriksson 23; Rebs: Eriksson 6 Asts: Grönhage 4	Arena: GA Hallen; Attendance: 139

October 29, 2022 7	Tureberg	54–72	Helsingborg BBK	Tureberg
17:00	Scoring by quarter: 8-28, 19-16, 12-18, 15-10
SEHTV	Pts: Jernberg 13; Rebs: Jernberg 8 Asts: Johansson 4	Boxscore	Pts: Rubiera 16; Rebs: P. Andersson 6 Asts: P. Andersson 4	Arena: Sollentuna Sporthall A Attendance: 75

November 6, 2022 8	Helsingborg BBK	82–90	Högsbo	Helsingborg
15:00	Scoring by quarter: 23-25, 15-18, 16-24, 28-23
SEHTV	Pts: P. Andersson 28; Rebs: Plomteux 14; Asts: Burke, Plomteux 4	Boxscore	Pts: Karras 25; Rebs: Drazic, Stewart 6 Asts: Drazic, Peleg 5	Arena: GA Hallen; Attendance: 324

November 12, 2022 9	Huddinge BBK	77–87	Helsingborg BBK	Huddinge
15:00	Scoring by quarter: 29-14, 21-24, 9-37, 18-12
SEHTV	Pts: Unger 25; Rebs: Unger 19; Asts: Chatziathanasiou 7	Boxscore	Pts: P. Andersson, Smakowski 24; Rebs: Plomteux 9 Asts: Plomteux 5	Arena: Edbohallen; Attendance: 114

November 19, 2022 10	Helsingborg BBK	103–75	AIK	Helsingborg
14:30	Scoring by quarter: 22-19, 24-11, 26-16, 31-29
SEHTV	Pts: Rubiera 23; Rebs: P. Andersson, Erhardt, Plomteux 7 Asts: Rubiera 5	Boxscore	Pts: Inan 14; Rebs: Sekeroglu 8 Asts: Inan 3	Arena: GA Hallen; Attendance: 64

November 23, 2022 11	IK Eos Lund	84–86	Helsingborg BBK	Lund
19:00	Scoring by quarter: 17-26, 22-18, 16-23, 29-19
SEHTV	Pts: Johansson 21; Rebs: Von Uthmann 12; Asts: Stepanovski 4	Boxscore	Pts: P. Andersson 21; Rebs: Rubiera 8 Asts: Smakowski 5	Arena: Eoshallen; Attendance: 268

December 10, 2022 12	Ockelbo	77–75	Helsingborg BBK	Ockelbo
16:00	Scoring by quarter: 23-25, 20-9, 14-20, 20-21
SEHTV	Pts: Stark 24; Rebs: Singateh 13; Asts: Stark 3	Boxscore	Pts: Rubiera 18; Rebs: Erhardt 12; Asts: Andersson, Westerlund 3	Arena: Kuxahallen; Attendance: 203

December 17, 2022 13	Helsingborg BBK	94–82	Huddinge BBK	Helsingborg
17:15	Scoring by quarter: 29-17, 2622, 13-21, 26-22
SEHTV	Pts: Smakowski 21; Rebs: P. Andersson 10; Asts: Burke 5	Boxscore	Pts: Unger Njie 23; Rebs: Wiberg Lloclla 8 Asts: Hök, Unger Njie 2	Arena: GA Hallen; Attendance: 73

January 8, 2023 14	Wetterbygden Stars	70–64	Helsingborg BBK	Jönköping
16:00	Scoring by quarter: 16-17, 16-10, 18-20, 20-17
SEHTV	Pts: Eriksson 18; Rebs: Bohman 19; Asts: Eriksson 4	Boxscore	Pts: P. Anderson 17; Rebs: Rietz 6 Asts: Smakowski 4	Arena: Huskvarna Sporthall; Attendance: 50

January 15, 2023 15	Helsingborg BBK	85–69	Norrort	Helsingborg
14:00	Scoring by quarter: 20-22, 14-21, 30-11, 21-15
SEHTV	Pts: P. Andersson 17; Rebs: Rubiera 8 Asts: Burke, Rietz 3	Report	Pts: Niklasson 16; Rebs: Larsson 6 Asts: Herlitz 2	Arena: GA Hallen; Attendance: 92

January 20, 2023 16	Högsbo	90–78	Helsingborg BBK	Gothenburg
19:30	Scoring by quarter: 30-27, 20-19, 14-12, 16-20
SEHTV	Pts: Peleg 17; Rebs: Stewart 16; Asts: Peleg, Stewart 4	Boxscore	Pts: Smakowski 23; Rebs: Plomteux 13; Asts: Rubiera 4	Arena: Gothia Arena 2 Attendance: 303

January 28, 2023 17	Helsingborg BBK	86–73	Tureberg	Helsingborg
17:15	Scoring by quarter: 14-23, 25-12, 22-16, 25-22
[SEHTV]	Pts: Smakowski 26; Rebs: Plomteux 16; Asts: Plomteux 5	Boxscore	Pts: Moberg 21; Rebs: Moberg 6 Asts: Larsson, Moberg 3	Arena: GA Hallen; Attendance: 115

February 4, 2023 18	Norrort	65–82	Helsingborg BBK	Täby
16:00	Scoring by quarter: 11-14, 19-17, 15-31, 20-20
SEHTV	Pts: Niklasson 23; Rebs: Niklasson 7 Asts: Herlitz, Ramstedt 4	Boxscore	Pts: Westerlund 17; Rebs: Plomteux 7 Asts: Plomteux 6	Arena: Tibblehalln; Attendance: 212

February 15, 2023 19	Helsingborg BBK	102–76	IK Eos Lund	Helsingborg
19:00	Scoring by quarter: 28-25, 21-20, 34-18, 19-13
SEHTV	Pts: Unger Njie 31; Rebs: Unger Njie 16; Asts: Unger Njie 9	Boxscore	Pts: Von Uthmann 24; Rebs: Von Uthmann 10; Asts: Miskovic 4	Arena: GA Hallen; Attendance: 98

February 18, 2023 20	RIG Mark	55–82	Helsingborg BBK	Kinna
17:00	Scoring by quarter: 19-21, 11-20, 16-23, 9-18
SEHTV	Pts: Andersson, Mårtenson 12; Rebs: Bodingh, Mårtenson 7 Asts: Andersson 4	Boxscore	Pts: Unger 16; Rebs: Unger 8 Asts: P. Andersson, Burke, Plomteux, Westerlund 3	Arena: Kinnahallen; Attendance: 30

February 26, 2023 21	Helsingborg BBK	100–71	Team4Q	Helsingborg
15:30	Scoring by quarter: 22-19, 31-16, 25-17, 25-19
SEHTV	Pts: Rubiera 24; Rebs: Joelsson, Rubiera, Unger 8 Asts: Burke, Rubiera 7	Boxscore	Pts: Glantz, Novakovic 17; Rebs: Andersson, Strazdauskas, Vural 6 Asts: Andersson, Strazdauskas, Vural 4	Arena: GA Hallen; Attendance: 170

March 5, 2023 22	Helsingborg BBK	87–68	Ockelbo	Helsingborg
12:15	Scoring by quarter: 21-16, 20-19, 29-14, 17-19
SEHTV	Pts: 19 Unger; Rebs: 12 Unger; Asts: Plomteux, Rubiera, Unger 8	Boxscore	Pts: Bramble, Stark 16; Rebs: Bramble 16; Asts: Stark 4	Arena: GA Hallen; Attendance: 200

March 25, 2023 23	Helsingborg BBK	94–72	Sloga Uppsala	Helsingborg
15:00	'Scoring by quarter: 22-21, 18-12, 26-'22, 28-17
SEHTV	Pts: Unger 23; Rebs: Plomteux, Rubiera, Unger 7 Asts: Rubiera 5	Boxscore	Pts: Ehrnvall 25; Rebs: Ehrnvall 14; Asts: Tanaskovic 5	Arena: GA Hallen; Attendance: 68

April 1, 2023 24	AIK	95–84	Helsingborg BBK	Solna
15:00	Scoring by quarter: 17-17, 28-24, 26-18, 24-25
SEHTV	Pts: Welander 22; Rebs: Nilsson, Welander 5 Asts: Gebriel, Yombi 7	Boxscore	Pts: Unger 19; Rebs: Unger 11; Asts: Burke 5	Arena: Vasalundshallen; Attendance: 90

== Playoffs ==
=== Men ===
==== Quarterfinals ====
April 6, 2023 1	AIK	77–97	Helsingborg BBK	Solna
19:30	Scoring by quarter: 17-26, 17-26, 18-18, 25-27
SEHTV	Pts: Welander 29; Rebs: Wahlberg 8 Asts: Wahlberg, Yombi 3	Boxscore	Pts: Unger 23; Rebs: Plomteux 15; Asts: Unger 5	Arena: Vasalundshallen

April 10, 2023 2	Helsingborg BBK	94–94	AIK	Helsingborg
17:00	Scoring by quarter: 26-26, 26-14, 25-27, 17-27
SEHTV	Pts: Unger 27; Rebs: Unger 8 Asts: Burke, Plomteux, Unger 4	Boxscore	Pts: Welander 25; Rebs: Sralla 13; Asts: Nilsson 5	Arena: GA Hallen; Attendance: 215
Note: Game able to finish in tie because point difference determines the advancing team

==== Semifinals ====
April 14, 2023 1	Norrort	65–93	Helsingborg BBK	Täby
10:00	Scoring by quarter: 9-29, 14-16, 22-24, 20-24
SEHTV	Pts: Herlitz 25; Rebs: Herlitz 9 Asts: Rafstedt 5	Boxscore	Pts: Rubiera 25; Rebs: Rubiera 16; Asts: Plomteux, Rubiera 5	Arena: Tibblehalln; Attendance: 400

April 16, 2023 2	Helsingborg BBK	97–97	Norrort	Helsingborg
14:30	Scoring by quarter: 23-23, 35-32, 21-22, 18-20
	Pts: Rubiera 30; Rebs: Unger 13; Asts: Plomteux 6	Boxscore	Pts: Niklasson 25; Rebs: Brygt, Herlitz, Larsson, Niklasson 3 Asts: Herlitz 6	Arena: GA Hallen; Attendance: 195
Note: Game able to finish in tie because point difference determines the advancing team

==== Finals ====
April 23, 2023 1	Helsingborg BBK	96–87	Eskilstuna	Helsingborg
14:00
SEHTV	Pts: Plomteux 25; Rebs: Unger 15; Asts: Rubiera 6	Boxscore	Pts: Ninkingira 27; Rebs: Ninkingira 9 Asts: Brådd, Larsson 5	Arena: GA Hallen; Attendance: 280

April 26, 2023 3	Eskilstuna	100–70	Helsingborg BBK	Eskilstuna
19:00	Scoring by quarter: 31-22, 18-14, 24-17, 27-17
SEHTV	Pts: Findén 30; Rebs: Karahmetovic 8 Asts: Karahmetovic 6	Boxscore	Pts: Unger 20; Rebs: Unger 8 Asts: Rubiera 4	Arena: STIGA Sports Arena B Attendance: 450

April 29, 2023 3	Helsingborg BBK	87–74	Eskilstuna	Helsingborg
15:00	Scoring by quarter: 34-24, 17-18, 22-14, 14-19
SEHTV	Pts: Unger 25; Rebs: Unger 10; Asts: Smakowski 4	Boxscore	Pts: Karahmetovic 16; Rebs: Brådd, Karahmetovic 8 Asts: Brådd, Karahmetovic, Mirianidis 4	Arena: GA Hallen; Attendance: 387
