= Brahe Basket =

- Founded: 1976
- Arena: Huskvarna Sporthall
- Location: Huskvarna, Sweden

Brahe Basket is a basketball club in Huskvarna, Sweden. The club was established in 1976. and has played in the Swedish top division on both the men's and the women's sides. The women's team lost the Swedish national championship playoff finals in the season of 2003-2004, losing to the Solna Vikings.
