= Swedish Basketball League MVP (women) =

The Swedish Basketball League MVP award is an annual award that is handed out to the most valuable player in the Basketligan dam (SBL), which is the highest tier of professional basketball in the country of Sweden.

== Winners ==
Season	Player	Pos.	Nationality	Team	Ref
2020-21	Klara Lundquist	G	Sweden	Alvik Basket	
