= Cecilia Ferm =

Swedish basketball player

Personal information
- Born: 9 October 1975 (age 51) Stockholm, Sweden
- Listed height: 180 cm (5 ft 11 in)
- Position: Forward
- Number: 12

Career history
- 2003–2007: Solna Vikings
- 2007–2008: KFUM Järfälla
- 2008–2009: Solna Vikings
- 2009–2010: Stockholmspolisens IF
- 2010–2011: KFUM Järfälla
- 2012–2016: Akropol BBK
- 2016–2017: AIK Basket
Medals
Women's basketball
Deaflympics
Silver medal – second place	Copenhagen 1997	team
Silver medal – second place	Rome 2001	team
Silver medal – second place	Melbourne 2005	team
Gold medal – first place	Taipei 2009	team

Cecilia Helena Ferm (born 9 October 1975) is a Swedish deaf female basketball player. She has represented both national and deaf basketball teams. Ferm has participated at the Deaflympics on 5 occasions since making her debut in the 1993 Summer Deaflympics.

She was the key member of the Swedish deaf basketball team that won silver medals at the 1997, 2001 and 2005 Deaflympic events. In her last Deaflympic event, in 2009, she was able to claim the gold medal for Sweden in the basketball for the first time in Deaflympic history after a stunning victory over favourites USA and it ended the gold medal jinx for Sweden.

She won the ICSD Deaf Sportswoman of the Year award in 2000 and in 2004 for her outstanding performance in the deaf basketball competitions including the deaflympic basketball. Cecilia Ferm was also nominated for the Deaf Sportswoman of the Year award by the ICSD in 1998, 1999, 2002 and in 2007.

She has also played for some elite basketball club teams such as Solna Vikings, Akropol and Nerike Basket. Cecilia Ferm is currently playing for the Swedish club side, AIK Basket.
