= 2022–23 Superettan season (basketball) =

Superettan
- League: Superettan
- Season: 2022-23
- Duration: 24 September 2022 - 29 April 2023
- Teams: 13
- TV partner(s): sehtv.se

Regular season
- Top seed: Högsbo
- Relegated: Team4Q

Finals
- Champions: Helsingborg
- Runners-up: Eskilstuna
- Semifinalists: Lund; Norrort

Statistical leaders
Points	(Sweden) Gustav Moberg	25.25
Rebounds	(Canada) Opong Bramble	11.9
Assists	(Sweden) Max Andersson	7.9

Records
- Winning streak: Högsbo (9)
- Losing streak: Team 4Q (10)
- All statistics correct as of 30 April 2023.

Location of teams in the 2022-23 Superettan
Location of Stockholm teams during the 2022-23 season

The 2022–23 Superettan season is the 6th season of Superettan (SEH), the second tier basketball league in Sweden. Uppsala Basket were the winners of both the regular season and the playoffs in the previous year. Both Uppsala and Kalmar decided to take the step up to the Swedish Basketball League after last season, allowing for four new teams to be promoted from Basketettan. The new teams were Eskilstuna, Huddinge, Sloga Uppsala, and Tureberg.

== Teams ==
Team	City	Venue	Capacity
AIK	Solna	Vasalundshallen	N/A
Eskilstuna Basket	Eskilstuna	STIGA Sports Arena	N/A
IK Eos	Lund	Eoshallen	350
Norrort	Täby	Tibblehallen	1,000
Helsingborg BBK	Helsingborg	GA Hallen	500
Ockelbo BBK	Ockelbo	Kuxahallen	840
Team4Q	Helsingborg	GA Hallen	500
Wetterbygden	Huskvarna	Huskvarna Sporthall	422
Sloga Uppsala	Uppsala	USIF Arena	N/A
RIG Mark	Kinna	Kinnahallen	N/A
Högsbo	Gothenburg	Gothia Arena	1,000
Tureberg	Sollentuna	Sollentuna Sporthall	320
Huddinge	Huddinge	Edbohallen	N/A

== League Table ==
Pos	Team	Pld	W	L	PF	PA	PD	Pts	Qualification
1	Högsbo	24	21	3	2290	1945	+345	42	Promoted to SBL and qualifies to playoffs
2	Helsingborg	24	18	6	2086	1848	+238	36	Qualification to playoffs
3	Tureberg	24	15	9	2119	1979	+140	30	Qualification to playoffs
4	Eskilstuna	24	14	10	2094	2029	+65	28	Qualification to playoffs
5	Ockelbo	24	13	11	2026	1932	+94	26	Qualification to playoffs
6	Norrort	24	13	11	1928	1945	−17	26	Qualification to playoffs
7	AIK	24	13	11	2040	2032	+8	26	Qualification to playoffs
8	RIG Mark	24	11	13	1809	1837	−28	22	Unable to qualify do to being a federation team
9	IK Eos Lund	24	10	14	2164	2226	−62	20	Qualification to playoffs
10	Wetterbygden	24	10	14	1977	2106	−129	20	
11	Sloga Uppsala	24	9	15	1985	2055	−70	18	
12	Huddinge	24	7	17	1912	2036	−124	14	
13	Team4Q	24	2	22	1889	2349	−460	4	Relegated to Basketettan

Updated to match(es) played on 3 April 2023. Source: Profixio

== Playoffs ==
Quarterfinals
1	Högsbo	89	94	183
8	Eos	100	90	190
4	Eskilstuna	95	80	175
5	Ockelbo	79	64	143
3	Tureberg	88	79	167
6	Norrort	100	86	186
2	Helsingborg	97	94	191
7	AIK	77	94	171

Semifinals
8	Eos	95	89	184
4	Eskilstuna	93	107	200
6	Norrort	65	97	162
2	Helsingborg	93	97	190

Finals
4	Eskilstuna	87	100	74	1
2	Helsingborg	96	70	87	2

== Notable occurrences ==
- On November 28, 2022, the Swedish Basketball Federation announced that the Trelleborg Pirates were to be shut out due to a number of serious violations. All results involving the team were subsequently removed from all team records and the season continued as normal for the remaining 13 teams.
- On April 10, 8th seed Eos eliminated 1st seed in the first round of the playoffs.
- On April 29, Helsingborg defeated Eskilstuna in game 3 of the Superettan Finals to win the Superettan Championship.
