= Helsingborg BBK =

- 2023–24 Helsingborg BBK season
- Nickname: HBBK
- Leagues: Basketettan (Women's); Superettan (Men's)
- Founded: 2009; 17 years ago
- History: List: IFK Helsingborg (1956–1978) Helsingborgs Basket (1978–2009) Helsingborg BBK (2009–present)
- Arena: GA-Hallen
- Capacity: 500
- Location: Helsingborg, Sweden
- Team colors: White, Blue
- President: Mikael Karlsson
- Vice-president: Henrik Kovacs
- Head coach: Erik Palmer (Women's); Xavi Mascaró (Men's)
- Championships: 1 Superettan
- Website: Helsingborgbasketbollklubb.se
Home	Away

Helsingborg Basketbollklubb is a basketball club based in Helsingborg, Sweden. The association is a continuation of Helsingborgs Basket, which went bankrupt in 2009. During the 2023–24 season, the men's team play in Superettan and the women's team play in Division 2. The men's team also compete in the Swedish Cup.

== History ==
=== Pre HBBK era ===
The current association was established on 12 May 2009. Its predecessor, Helsingborgs Basket, formed in 1978 as a merger between IFK Helsingborg basketball section, which started in 1956, and BK Panthers, before eventually breaking away from IFK in the early 1970s. IFK Helsingborg won its first and only championship title in 1969. Besides this, IFK Helsingborg also won five cup titles, including the last time the Cup was held in 1978. In 1986, Helsingborgs Basket were relegated from the top division, and a few years later in 1992, found themselves in Division 2. The club returned to the Swedish Basketball League (the highest tier of Swedish basketball) in 2003. In 2006 and 2008 the club played under the name Öresundskraft Basketball.

On April 9, 2009, the club withdrew from the Swedish basketball league for the 2009/2010 season, due to a lack of sponsors. The economic situation eventually became too difficult and as Helsingborg did not want to endorse a new loan, the club filed for bankruptcy on May 11, 2009. The day after Helsingborgs Baskets bankruptcy there was a meeting where it was decided that a new organization would be created under the name, Helsingborg Basketball Club (HBBK). Due to HBBK being a new club, both the men's and women's teams were forced to qualify for Division 2 for the season 2009/2010. Both went through from their qualifier and both advanced to Basketettan for the 2010/2011 season.

=== Superettan ===
==== 2018–2020 ====
Their first season in Superettan ended in fourth place with a 12–12 record.

The men's last game during their first stint in Superettan ended up, as most other games that season, in a loss. Due to the COVID-19 pandemic, the season was ended early and not all the games were played. This meant that they finished the season in last place with a 3–22 record. Due to the pandemic and the season ending early SBBF were forced to make the decision on which tier they were to play in during their next season. This decision ended up being that they were to be relegated.

==== 2021 ====
Due to the coronavirus pandemic and restrictions only one game was played by Helsingborg in Basketettan south during the 2020–21 season. The Swedish Basketball Federation was therefore forced to make decisions out of the ordinary this season as well. With HBBK's will to play in Superettan as strong as ever they chose to apply for a spot in the second tier for the following season. After proving to the federation that the organization had a strong enough base the decision was made that Helsingborg would play in Superettan once again.

=== Women in SBL ===
The first season in the Swedish Basketball League was a season filled with tough experiences. It took the team 11 games to get their first win in SBL, also the first-ever victory in the highest tier of Swedish basketball ever. This would be their only win in their inaugural season, ending with a 1–21 record. Due to the decision made by the Swedish Basketball Federation on June 11, 2020 that no team will be relegated from SBL after the 2020–21 season. It gave HBBK the security of staying up.

After an impressive second season in SBL, finishing 11th and only 3 wins away from the playoffs, the board made the decision to withdraw. Due to both organisational and financial reasons.

== Kärnan Cup ==
Kärnan Cup is an annual basketball tournament hosted by Helsingborg BBK. The tournament is available for all teams around the world and acts like a kickstart to the basketball season. The cup takes place during the end of August, before the season starts.

== Season by season ==
=== Men's Season by season ===
Season	Tier	League	W	L	Pos.	Playoffs
2015–16	3	Basketettan Södra	14	10	4	
2016–17	3	Basketettan Södra	13	8	3	
2017–18	3	Basketettan Södra	18	0	1	
2018–19	2	Superettan	12	12	4	
2019–20	2	Superettan	3	22	10	
2020-21	3	Basketettan Södra	1	0	N/A	
2021-22	2	Superettan	10	12	7	Quarterfinals
2022-23	2	Superettan	18	6	2	Champions

=== Women's Season by season ===
Season	Tier	League	W	L	Pos.
2015–16	2	Basketettan Södra	9	6	2
2016–17	2	Basketettan Södra	11	10	5
2017–18	2	Basketettan Södra	15	6	3
2018–19	2	Basketettan Södra	12	6	4
2019–20	2	Basketettan Södra	17	3	2
2020-21	1	Basketligan dam	1	21	12
2021-22	1	Basketligan dam	9	17	11
2022-23	2	Basketettan Södra	7	19	13

== Players ==
=== Current rosters ===
2023-24 HBBK Roster roster
Players
Coaches

Pos.	No.	Nat.	Name	Ht.	Wt.	Age
G	3	(Sweden)	Ruben Sternheden	1.82 m (6 ft 0 in)		19 – 1 March 2007
G	4	(Sweden)	Anton Persson	1.80 m (5 ft 11 in)		28 – 6 December 1997
C	5	(France)	Baptiste Chazelas	1.98 m (6 ft 6 in)		28 – 20 July 1997
F	5	(Sweden)	Felix Carlsson	1.98 m (6 ft 6 in)		30 – 19 September 1995
F	5	(Sweden)	Samoro Unger Njie	1.95 m (6 ft 5 in)		32 – 25 February 1994
G	6	(Sweden)	Rami Ismail	1.80 m (5 ft 11 in)		29 – 2 January 1997
F/C	7	(Spain)	Boubacar Gassama	2.01 m (6 ft 7 in)		26 – 15 October 1999
G/F	9	(Sweden)	Alexander Samkowski	1.88 m (6 ft 2 in)		26 – 1 February 2000
F	10	(Sweden)	Patrik Andersson (C)	1.91 m (6 ft 3 in)		31 – 5 December 1994
F	11	(Sweden)	Rickard Rietz	2.05 m (6 ft 9 in)		23 – 8 July 2002
PG	12	(Sweden)	Jacob Burke	1.80 m (5 ft 11 in)		23 – 14 October 2002
G	13	(Sweden)	Oliver Cupan	1.94 m (6 ft 4 in)		23 – 19 May 2002
F	14	(Sweden)	Carl Thore	1.90 m (6 ft 3 in)		21 – 14 December 2004
C	16	(Sweden)	Jack Rönndahl	2.05 m (6 ft 9 in)		16 – 3 August 2009
G/F	17	(Norway) (Sweden)	David Tastad	1.83 m (6 ft 0 in)		23 – 14 June 2002

Head coach

- Xavi Mascaró

Assistant coach(es)

- Anders Rönndahl
- Enric Orozco I Piqué

Legend

- (C) Team captain
- Injured

- Roster
Updated: March 11, 2024

2022-23 HBBK Women's roster
Players
Coaches

Pos.	No.	Nat.	Name	Ht.	Wt.	Age
	2	(Sweden)	Zinah Al-Ameri			20 – 29 September 2005
F	2	(Poland)	Natalia Panufnik	1.78 m (5 ft 10 in)		29 – 21 June 1996
F	4	(Sweden)	Maryam Al-Ameri	1.80 m (5 ft 11 in)		23 – 14 January 2003
	5	(Sweden)	Clara Eneroth			20 – 5 May 2005
	6	(Sweden)	Anastasia Stepanovska			22 – 5 September 2003
G	7	(Sweden)	Kelly Le	1.69 m (5 ft 7 in)		24–25 – Missing required parameter 1=month! 2001
PG	7	(France) (Senegal)	Dieng Fatou	1.67 m (5 ft 6 in)		40 – 18 August 1985
	8	(Sweden)	Klara Friberg			19–20 – Missing required parameter 1=month! 2006
	9	(Sweden)	Märtha Ursberg			18–19 – Missing required parameter 1=month! 2007
	10	(Sweden)	Celia Pravita			18 – 27 September 2007
	11	(Sweden)	Molly Karlsson			18 – 4 January 2008
	12	(Sweden)	Selma Olofsson			20–21 – Missing required parameter 1=month! 2005
	13	(Sweden)	Alina Sjögren			20 – 6 April 2006
F	16	(Sweden)	Miriam Wahlqvist			21 – 22 April 2004
F	18	(Sweden)	Tyra Eriksson			21 – 17 May 2004

Head coach

- Ville Touminen

Physiotherapist(s)

- Helena Eneroth

Legend

- (C) Team captain
- Injured

- Roster
Updated: February 19, 2023

=== Notable players ===
Note: Flags indicate national team eligibility at FIBA-sanctioned events. Players may hold other non-FIBA nationalities not displayed.

Criteria

To appear in this section a player must have either:

- Set a club record or won an individual award while at the club
- Played at least one official international match for their national team at any time
- Played at least one official NBA match at any time.

- (Sweden) Simon Birgander
- (Sweden) Freja Werth
- (Sweden) Mathilda Ågren
- (Finland) Sara Rokkanen
- (Finland) Ebba Pekonen
- (Greece) Vasiliki Louka
- (Kosovo) Gazmend Sinani
- (Sweden) Johan Åkesson
- (Senegal) Fatou Dieng

== Media and broadcasting ==
For the 2022-23 season, the men's team will have their games streamed on SEHTV and the women's team will have their games streamed on Solidsport.

- Men's streaming
- Women's streaming

== Honours and achievements ==
Swedish League

- Winners (1): 1968–69

Superettan

- Winners (1): 2022-23
