= Martin Borg =

Swedish basketball player

Personal information
- Born: 21 February 1977 (age 49) Sweden
- Listed height: 188 cm (6 ft 2 in)

Career information
- Playing career: 1996–2008
- Position: Point guard

Career history
- Solna Vikings

Career highlights
- Swedish Basketball League champion (2002–03)

Martin Borg (born 21 February 1977) is a Swedish former professional basketball player who played as a point guard. Best remembered for his time with the Solna Vikings, he was considered a three-point specialist and helped the team win the 2002–03 Swedish Basketball League. A full international between 1998 and 1999, he appeared 11 times for the Sweden national basketball team.

== Career statistics ==
=== International ===
Appearances and points by national team and year
National team	Year	Apps	Points
Sweden	1998	10	29
Sweden	1999	1	0
Total		11	29

== Honours ==
Solna Vikings

- Swedish Basketball League: 2002–03
