= Solna Vikings =

- Nickname: Vikings
- Founded: 1999
- Dissolved: 2016
- Arena: Solnahallen
- Capacity: 2,000
- Location: Solna, Sweden
- Team colors: Blue, Yellow
- Championships: 6 Swedish Championships; 1973, 1984, 1985, 1989, 2003, 2008
Home	Away

Solna Vikings was a Swedish professional basketball club with a men's team and a women's team. Both played in their respective top leagues: the women in the Damligan, and the men in the Swedish Basketball League.

== History ==
The Solna Vikings was founded on 27 April 1999, when Solna IF announced that it would not continue playing. Solna Vikings Men won the Swedish men's national championship in 2003, and the women won the national championship in 2002, 2004 and 2006.

On 6 July 2015 it was announced that the men's team was leaving the Swedish Basketball League because of economic problems. In June 2016, the club merged with AIK Basket.

== Men's team ==
=== Trophies ===
- Basketligan

Champions (1): 2002–03

=== Notable players ===
Note: Flags indicate national team eligibility at FIBA-sanctioned events. Players may hold other non-FIBA nationalities not displayed.

Criteria

To appear in this section a player must have either:

- Set a club record or won an individual award while at the club
- Played at least one official international match for their national team at any time
- Played at least one official NBA match at any time.

- (Sweden) Alexander Lindqvist
- (Sweden) Martin Borg
- (Finland) Roope Ahonen
- (Finland) Petri Virtanen

== Women's team ==
=== Trophies ===
- Basketligan dam

Champions (3): 2001–02, 2003–04, 2005–06

=== Notable players ===
Criteria

To appear in this section a player must have either:

- Played at least three seasons for the club.
- Set a club record or won an individual award while at the club.
- Played at least one official international match for their national team at any time.
- Played at least one official WNBA match at any time.

- (United States) Cecilia Ferm
- (United States) A'Quonesia Franklin
- (United States) Charmin Smith

== See also ==
- 2008–09 EuroCup Women
