= Toni Vitali =

Croatian basketball player

Personal information
- Born: 14 January 1991 (age 35) Trogir, SR Croatia, SFR Yugoslavia
- Listed height: 6 ft 8 in (2.03 m)
- Listed weight: 216 lb (98 kg)

Career information
- NBA draft: 2013: undrafted
- Playing career: 2006–present
- Position: Power forward

Career history
- 2006–2013: Trogir
- 2013–2015: Alkar Sinj
- 2015–2016: Borås Basket
- 2016–2017: Zagreb
- 2017–2018: GKK Šibenik
- 2018–2019: Cedevita
- 2019–2023: Högsbo

Career highlights
- A-1 MVP (2015)

Toni Vitali (born 14 January 1991) is a Croatian professional basketball player.
