= Solna Gymnasium =

Secondary school in Solna, Sweden

Coordinates: 59.3677°N 18.0003°E

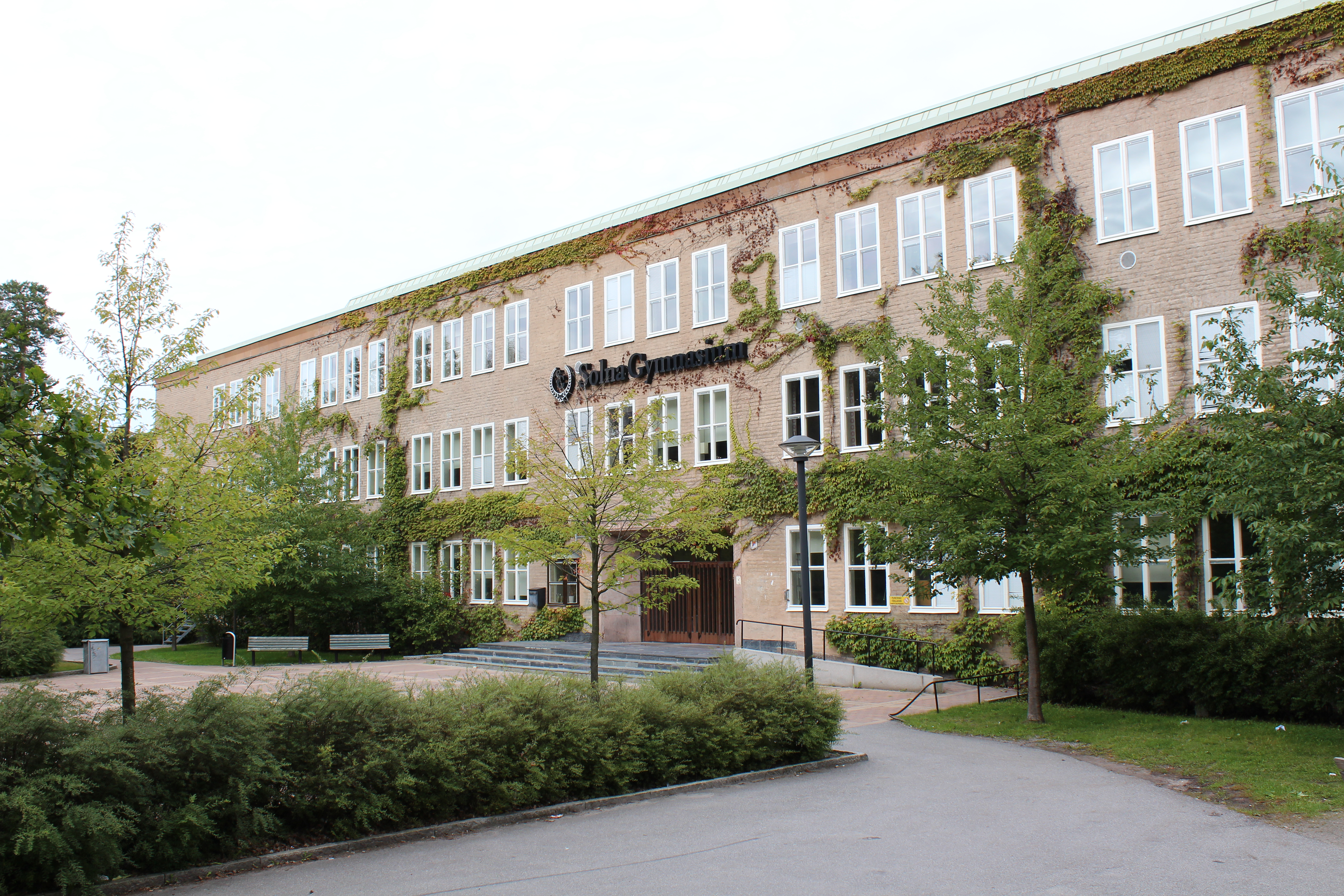
Solna gymnasium

Solna Gymnasium is a secondary school in Solna, Sweden, in the Stockholm metropolitan area. It was opened as the Solna Läroverk in April 1948. Crown Prince Gustaf VI Adolf of Sweden attended the opening.
