= Swedish Basketball Federation =

Basketball governing body in Sweden

- Sport: Basketball
- Jurisdiction: Sweden
- Abbreviation: SBBF
- Founded: 25 October 1952
- Affiliation: FIBA
- Regional affiliation: FIBA Europe
- Headquarters: Stockholm
- President: Susanne Jidesten

Official website
- www.basket.se
- (Sweden)

The Swedish Basketball Federation (Swedish: Svenska Basketbollförbundet) also known as SBBF is the governing body of basketball in Sweden. It was established on 25 October 1952 out of the Swedish Handball Federation's basketball section, which had been started in 1948. Its headquarters are in Stockholm.

The Swedish Basketball Federation operates the Sweden men's national basketball team and Sweden women's national team. They organize national competitions in Sweden, for both the men's and women's senior teams and also the youth national basketball teams.

The top professional league in Sweden is the Basketligan.

== History ==
In 1948, the Swedish Basketball Federation was established as a section within the Swedish Handball Federation. Four years later, it became its own separate association, and the first chairman of the federation was Lars-Åke Nilsson. Sweden's first participation in the European Championship was in 1953, where they finished, seventeenth out of 17 teams, at last place. The first national championships (SM-serierna) for men started in 1954, and for women in 1957. KFUM Söder (today Fryshuset Basket) won the championship for men, and BK Rilton for women.

In the 1980 Moscow Olympic Games, Sweden's men's national team participated for the first time and finished in tenth place in the tournament. In 1992, under Kenny Lövingsson’s chairmanship, the Swedish Basketball League (Basketligan) was established in Sweden, consisting of 13 teams. Sweden participated in two consecutive European Championships (1993 and 1995), which were held in Germany and Greece, respectively. In 2003, Sweden hosted the European Championship for men, where Lithuania emerged as the European champions.

In 1998, the first Swedish player, Tanja Kostic, was drafted to the world's premier women's basketball league, the WNBA. On the men's side, it was Jonas Jerebko from Kinna who got drafted to the Detroit Pistons in 2009.

Sweden's women's national team competed in the 2013 European Championship in France and finished in seventh place, their best placement since 1987.

== Competitions ==
=== National leagues ===
Level	Men	Women
1	Swedish Basketball League; 11 teams	Basketligan dam 14 teams
2	Superettan (basketball); 13 teams	
3	Basketettan 21 teams	

== Chairpersons ==
1. 1952–1969: Lars-Åke Nilsson
2. 1969–1975: Leif Forsberg
3. 1975–1979: Anders Wijkman
4. 1979–1986: Bengt Wallin
5. 1986–1990: Arne Jansson
6. 1990–1991: Kaj Sandell
7. 1991–1992: Eleonor Rehn-Jacobsson
8. 1992–1996: Kenny Lövingsson
9. 1996–1999: Kari Marklund
10. 1999–2001: Kaj Krantz
11. 2001–2004: Niklas Nordström
12. 2004–2008: Jan Jacobsen
13. 2008–2009: Anna Westin
14. 2009–2016: Hans Von Uthmann
15. 2016–2020: Mats Carlson
16. 2020–: Susanne Jidesten

== See also ==
- Sweden men's national basketball team
- Sweden men's national under-18 basketball team
- Sweden men's national under-16 basketball team
- Sweden women's national basketball team
- Sweden women's national under-18 basketball team
- Sweden women's national under-16 basketball team
