= Basketligan dam =

Svenska Basketligan Dam
- Founded: 2001; 25 years ago
- First season: 2001-02
- Country: Sweden
- Confederation: FIBA Europe
- Number of teams: 14
- Level on pyramid: 1
- Relegation to: Basketettan Dam
- International cup: EuroCup Women
- Current champions: Luleå Basket (2024–25)
- Most championships: Luleå Basket (7 titles)
- Website: basketligandam.se
- 2024–25 season

Location of teams in the 2021-22 Basketligan

Basketligan dam, formerly known as Damligan until 2011–12, is the top professional women's basketball league in Sweden. It began in the 2001–02 season, when it replaced the old Elitserien. The league currently has 14 teams.

== History ==
=== Champions ===
Season	Champion	Runner-up	Score	Finals MVP
2001-02	Solna Vikings	Norrköpings Dambasketklubb	3-0	N/A
2002-03	08 Stockholm Human Rights	Solna Vikings	3-1	N/A
2003-04	Solna Vikings	Brahe Basket	3-0	
2004-05	Visby Ladies	Luleå Basket	3-2	
2005-06	Solna Vikings	Luleå Basket	3-1	
2006-07	08 Stockholm Human Rights	Luleå Basket	3-0	
2007-08	Solna Vikings	Telge Basket	3-2	
2008-09	Solna Vikings	Telge Basket	3-1	
2009-10	08 Stockholm Human Rights	Solna Vikings	3-1	
2010-11	Telge Basket	Luleå Basket	3-0	
2011-12	Telge Basket	Northland Basket	3-0	
2012-13	Norrköping Dolphins	Solna Vikings	3-0	
2013-14	Northland Basket	Norrköping Dolphins	3-0	
2014-15	Northland Basket	Udominate Basket	3-1	
2015-16	Luleå Basket	Udominate Basket	3-2	
2016-17	Luleå Basket	Udominate Basket	3-1	
2017-18	Luleå Basket	Udominate Basket	3-1	
2018-19	A3 Basket	Högsbo Basket	3-1	
2019-20	Luleå Basket	Alvik Basket	N/A	
2020-21	Luleå Basket	Alvik Basket	3-2	

== Current teams ==
Team	City	Venue	Capacity
Borås Basket	Borås	Boråshallen	3,000
Luleå Basket	Luleå	Luleå Energi Arena	2,700
IK Eos	Lund	Eoshallen	350
Södertälje BBK	Södertälje	Täljehallen	2,100
Helsingborg BBK	Helsingborg	GA Hallen	500
Visby Ladies	Visby	ICA Maxi Arena	2,220
Östersund Basket	Östersund	Östersund Sporthall	1,700
Wetterbygden Sparks	Huskvarna	Huskvarna Sporthall	422
Uppsala Basket	Uppsala	Fyrishov	3,000
Norrköping Dolphins	Norrköping	Stadium Arena	3,500
Mark Basket	Kinna	Kinnahallen	N/A
Högsbo Basket	Gothenburg	Gothia Arena	1,000
Alvik Basket	Stockholm	Åkeshovshallen	N/A
A3 Basket	Umeå	Umea Energi Arena	2,000

== Awards ==
- Most Valuable Player
