= Luleå Basket =

- Leagues: Basketligan dam
- Founded: 1978
- Arena: Luleå Energi Arena
- Capacity: 3,000
- Location: Luleå, Sweden
- Championships: 7 (2014, 2015, 2016, 2017, 2018, 2021, 2023)
- Website: luleabasket.com

Luleå Basket is a professional women's basketball club in Luleå, Sweden. The club was established as Luleå Basketbollklubb (BBK) in 1978. The team competes in the Basketligan dam.

The team was known as Northland Basket between 2011 and 2015.

The team won their first Swedish women's national basketball championship in 2014. They went on to win five straight championships, with titles coming in 2015, 2016, 2017, and 2018. They won their sixth and seventh championships in 2021 and 2023.
