= Visby BBK =

- Founded: 1992
- Arena: Södervärnshallen
- Location: Visby, Sweden

Visby BBK is a women's basketball club in Visby, Sweden. The club was established in 1992 out of the Visby AIK basketball section. The women's team, playing as Visby Ladies, won the Swedish women's national basketball championship during the season of 2004–2005.

Tia Paschal played for the club during the 1997–1998 season.
