= Kalve =

Kalve may refer to:

- Kalve (surname)
- SK Kalve, a Latvian rugby club based in Riga.
- Kalve, Uttara Kannada, settlement in Uttara Kannada, India
