= SK Kalve =

Sporta klubs Kalve
- Location: Riga, Latvia
- Coach(es): Vladimirs Ņikonovs
Team kit

SK Kalve is a Latvian rugby club based in Riga. It was formed after the merging of SK Ovals and RK 1964, also known as Ādažu Čipši and Remus presumably after sponsors.
