= Kalve (surname) =

Kalve is a Latvian surname literally meaning "smithy" (a place where a blacksmith works). Notable people with the surname include:

- Aivars Kalve (1937–1994), Latvian writer, publicist, and art critic
- Ernests Kalve (born 1987), a Latvian former professional basketball player and assistant coach for BK Ogre
- Pēteris Kalve (1882–1913), Latvian artist
