= 1998–99 Úrvalsdeild karla =

Icelandic basketball season

DHL deild karla^{1}
- Duration: October 1, 1998 – April 22, 1999
- Teams: 12

Regular season
- Top seed: Keflavík
- Relegated: Valur

Finals
- Champions: Keflavík (5th title)
- Runners-up: Njarðvík
- Semifinalists: KFÍ, Grindavík

Awards
- Domestic MVP: (Iceland) Falur Harðarson
- Foreign MVP: (United States) Damon Johnson

Statistical leaders
Points	(United States) John Woods	30.5
Rebounds	(United States) Rob Wilson	14.6
Assists	(United States) Warren Peebles	8.3
- ^{1} Sponsored league name, referring to Úrvalsdeild karla.

The 1998–99 Úrvalsdeild karla was the 47th season of the Úrvalsdeild, the top tier men's basketball league on Iceland. The season started on October 1, 1998 and ended on April 22, 1999. Keflavík won its fifth title by defeating Njarðvík 3–2 in the Finals.

== Competition format ==
The participating teams first played a conventional round-robin schedule with every team playing each opponent once "home" and once "away" for a total of 22 games. The top eight teams qualified for the championship playoffs whilst the bottom team was relegated to Division 1.

== Regular season ==
Pos	Team	Pld	W	L	PF	PA	PD	Pts	Qualification or relegation
1	Keflavík	22	20	2	2149	1802	+347	40	Qualification to playoffs
2	Njarðvík	22	18	4	2029	1658	+371	36	Qualification to playoffs
3	KFÍ	22	15	7	1894	1822	+72	30	Qualification to playoffs
4	Grindavík	22	14	8	1973	1847	+126	28	Qualification to playoffs
5	KR	22	14	8	1864	1781	+83	28	Qualification to playoffs
6	Tindastóll	22	11	11	1872	1846	+26	22	Qualification to playoffs
7	Snæfell	22	10	12	1715	1827	−112	20	Qualification to playoffs
8	Haukar	22	8	14	1713	1879	−166	16	Qualification to playoffs
9	ÍA	22	8	14	1703	1816	−113	16	
10	Þór Akureyri	22	5	17	1690	1965	−275	10	
11	Skallagrímur	22	5	17	1738	1886	−148	10	
12	Valur	22	4	18	1709	1921	−212	8	Relegated

Source: KKÍ

== Playoffs ==
Quarterfinals
1	Keflavík	2
8	Haukar	0
2	Njarðvík	2
7	Snæfell	0
(Pairings are reseeded after the first round)
3	KFÍ	2
6	Tindastóll	0
4	Grindavík	2
5	KR	0

Semifinals
1	Keflavík	3
5	Grindavík	0
2	Njarðvík	3
3	KFÍ	1

Finals
1	Keflavík	3
2	Njarðvík	2

== Notable occurrences ==
- On 12 November, David Bevis was suspended for one game after tossing a water bottle at a wall after ÍA's a loss against Þór Akureyri which resulted in water hitting referees and staff at the scorers table.
- On 23 November, it was reported that ÍA had released both David Bevis and Victor Pereira in a roster overhaul in what turned out to be an unpopular decision by head coach Alexander Ermolinskij.
