= Basketball at the 2017 Games of the Small States of Europe =

Basketball at the 2017 Games of the Small States of Europe was held from 30 May to 3 June 2017.

== Medal summary ==
Event	Gold	Silver	Bronze
Men	Cyprus	Montenegro	Iceland
Women	Malta	Iceland	Luxembourg

== Men's tournament ==
Men's tournament was played by six teams, that played a single-legged round robin tournament.

=== Standings ===
Pos	Team	Pld	W	L	PF	PA	PD	Pts	Medals	(Cyprus)	(Montenegro)	(Iceland)	(Luxembourg)	(Andorra)	(San Marino)
1	Cyprus (C)	5	5	0	402	326	+76	10	Gold medal	—	81–71	—	74–70	76–65	100–63
2	Montenegro	5	4	1	426	285	+141	9	Silver medal	—	—	—	79–57	—	—
3	Iceland	5	2	3	380	366	+14	7 (Note: Iceland 1–1, +11PD; Luxembourg 1–1, +1PD; Andorra 1–1, −12PD)	Bronze medal	57–71	61–86	—	—	—	—
4	Luxembourg	5	2	3	397	367	+30	7		—	—	73–86	—	98–84	99–44
5	Andorra	5	2	3	365	414	−49	7		—	49–90	83–81	—	—	84–69
6	San Marino (H)	5	0	5	266	478	−212	5		—	37–100	53–95	—	—	—

Source: San Marino 2017
(C) Champions; (H) Hosts

=== Results ===
30 May 2017	Montenegro	79–57	Luxembourg	Serravalle
10:00	Scoring by quarter: 22–16, 23–18, 16–14, 18–9
	Pts: Đukanović 17; Rebs: Radović 8 Asts: Vranješ 3	Boxscore	Pts: Schumacher 17; Rebs: Laurent, Stephens 6 Asts: Schumacher 4	Arena: Multieventi Sport Domus; Referees: Mattioli (ITA), Kounelles (CYP), Giancecchi (SMR)

30 May 2017	Iceland	57–71	Cyprus	Serravalle
15:00	Scoring by quarter: 16–18, 11–22, 19–13, 11–18
	Pts: Hlinason 13; Rebs: Hlinason 14; Asts: Jónsson 4	Boxscore	Pts: Panteli 18; Rebs: King 6 Asts: Kounas 5	Arena: Multieventi Sport Domus; Referees: Karović (BIH), Mazzoni (ITA), Weiwers (LUX)

30 May 2017	Andorra	84–69	San Marino	Serravalle
20:00	Scoring by quarter: 27–14, 26–22, 18–17, 13–16
	Pts: Colom 22; Rebs: Farfan, Gabriel 7 Asts: Colom 5	Boxscore	Pts: Moretti 20; Rebs: Zanotti 8 Asts: three players 2	Arena: Multieventi Sport Domus

31 May 2017	Cyprus	74–70	Luxembourg	Serravalle
12:30	Scoring by quarter: 19–18, 23–22, 20–12, 12–18
	Pts: King 19; Rebs: King 10; Asts: Kounas, Panteli 2	Boxscore	Pts: Laurent 14; Rebs: Vujakovic 7 Asts: Grun 4	Arena: Multieventi Sport Domus

31 May 2017	Andorra	49–90	Montenegro	Serravalle
17:30	Scoring by quarter: 22–27, 8–24, 13–21, 6–18
	Pts: Colom 10; Rebs: Gabriel 4 Asts: De Oliveira 2	Boxscore	Pts: Baćović 15; Rebs: Hadžibegović, Nikolić 8 Asts: Vranješ 4	Arena: Multieventi Sport Domus

31 May 2017	San Marino	53–95	Iceland	Serravalle
20:00	Scoring by quarter: 14–15, 10–26, 11–23, 18–31
	Pts: Biordi 12; Rebs: Biordi 13; Asts: seven players 1	Boxscore	Pts: Hlinason 15; Rebs: Hlinason 10; Asts: Jónsson 4	Arena: Multieventi Sport Domus

1 June 2017	Cyprus	81–71	Montenegro	Serravalle
10:00	Scoring by quarter: 25–12, 13–26, 18–17, 25–16
	Pts: Panteli 22; Rebs: King, Kounas 7 Asts: Sizopoulos 4	Boxscore	Pts: Pavličević, Radović 14; Rebs: Ilić 8 Asts: Đukanović 2	Arena: Multieventi Sport Domus; Referees: Mazzoni (ITA), Esteve (AND), Garðarsson (ISL)

1 June 2017	Andorra	83–81	Iceland	Serravalle
15:00	Scoring by quarter: 28–26, 21–22, 11–15, 23–18
	Pts: Colom 24; Rebs: Colom 10; Asts: Guzmán 2	Boxscore	Pts: Guðmundsson 24; Rebs: Hlinason 10; Asts: Baginski 4	Arena: Multieventi Sport Domus

1 June 2017	Luxembourg	99–44	San Marino	Serravalle
20:00	Scoring by quarter: 29–15, 17–18, 22–5, 31–6
	Pts: Grün 18; Rebs: Stephens 9 Asts: four players 3	Boxscore	Pts: Biordi 12; Rebs: Biordi 10; Asts: Casadei, Macina 3	Arena: Multieventi Sport Domus

2 June 2017	Cyprus	76–65	Andorra	Serravalle
15:00	Scoring by quarter: 15–14, 18–21, 22–15, 21–15
	Pts: Kounas 22; Rebs: King 19; Asts: three players 2	Boxscore	Pts: Farfan, Navarro 12; Rebs: Colom, Gabriel 6 Asts: Navarro 3	Arena: Multieventi Sport Domus

2 June 2017	Luxembourg	73–86	Iceland	Serravalle
17:30	Scoring by quarter: 25–13, 16–22, 23–28, 9–23
	Pts: Schumacher 22; Rebs: Laurent 8 Asts: Schumacher 5	Boxscore	Pts: Jónsson 18; Rebs: Hlinason 11; Asts: Sigurðarson 4	Arena: Multieventi Sport Domus

2 June 2017	San Marino	37–100	Montenegro	Serravalle
20:00	Scoring by quarter: 14–27, 6–29, 8–29, 9–15
	Pts: Cardinali 9 Rebs: Moretti 5 Asts: Moretti 2	Boxscore	Pts: Knežević, Mugoša 18; Rebs: Pavić 10; Asts: Pavličević, Vrbica 4	Arena: Multieventi Sport Domus

3 June 2017	Luxembourg	98–84	Andorra	Serravalle
10:00	Scoring by quarter: 24–23, 21–22, 20–28, 33–11
	Pts: Schumacher 25; Rebs: Stephens 15; Asts: Stephens 5	Boxscore	Pts: Colom 20; Rebs: Colom 6 Asts: Fernández, Schneider 3	Arena: Multieventi Sport Domus

3 June 2017	Cyprus	100–63	San Marino	Serravalle
12:30	Scoring by quarter: 17–16, 23–9, 28–21, 32–17
	Pts: Pittakas 20; Rebs: Panteli 12; Asts: Koronides 7	Report	Pts: Moretti 27; Rebs: four players 3 Asts: Moretti 4	Arena: Multieventi Sport Domus

3 June 2017	Iceland	61–86	Montenegro	Serravalle
15:00	Scoring by quarter: 15–17, 16–23, 12–25, 18–21
	Pts: Acox 12; Rebs: Guðmundsson, Hlinason 11; Asts: Guðmundsson 4	Report	Pts: Hadžibegović 20; Rebs: Hadžibegović 10; Asts: Hadžibegović 6	Arena: Multieventi Sport Domus

== Women's tournament ==
=== Standings ===
Only four teams participated in the women's competition, consisting in a single-legged round robin tournament.

Pos	Team	Pld	W	L	PF	PA	PD	Pts	Medals	(Malta)	(Iceland)	(Luxembourg)	(Cyprus)
1	Malta (C)	3	3	0	192	140	+52	6	Gold medal	—	68–49	52–50	72–41
2	Iceland	3	2	1	171	159	+12	5	Silver medal	—	—	59–44	—
3	Luxembourg	3	1	2	153	158	−5	4	Bronze medal	—	—	—	—
4	Cyprus	3	0	3	135	194	−59	3		—	47–63	47–59	—

Source: San Marino 2017
(C) Champions

=== Results ===
30 May 2017	Malta	72–41	Cyprus	Serravalle
17:30	Scoring by quarter: 23–11, 20–13, 13–9, 16–8
	Pts: J. Grima 14; Rebs: Vella 10; Asts: Pace 3	Boxscore	Pts: Pitsillidou 12; Rebs: Orpovic 9 Asts: Koniali 2	Arena: Multieventi Sport Domus

31 May 2017	Cyprus	47–59	Luxembourg	Serravalle
10:00	Scoring by quarter: 8–18, 9–6, 14–18, 16–17
	Pts: Orpovic 14; Rebs: Orpovic 14; Asts: Koniali 3	Boxscore	Pts: Mossong 17; Rebs: Orban 14; Asts: Mossong 4	Arena: Multieventi Sport Domus; Referees: Karović (BIH), Giancecchi (SMR), Herbetsson (ISL)

31 May 2017	Malta	68–49	Iceland	Serravalle
15:00	Scoring by quarter: 19–6, 18–14, 23–12, 8–17
	Pts: De Martino 22; Rebs: C. Grima, J. Grima 10; Asts: Vella 5	Boxscore	Pts: Kjartansdóttir 13; Rebs: Kjartansdóttir 11; Asts: three players 2	Arena: Multieventi Sport Domus

1 June 2017	Malta	52–50	Luxembourg	Serravalle
12:30	Scoring by quarter: 12–7, 4–20, 16–13, 20–10
	Pts: C. Grima, Vella 10; Rebs: Pace 7 Asts: Pace 4	Boxscore	Pts: Schmit 13; Rebs: Hetting 8 Asts: Diederich, Schmit 2	Arena: Multieventi Sport Domus

1 June 2017	Cyprus	47–63	Iceland	Serravalle
17:30	Scoring by quarter: 5–16, 18–10, 13–11, 11–26
	Pts: Koniali 14; Rebs: Pilakouta 8 Asts: Koniali 3	Boxscore	Pts: Hinriksdóttir 19; Rebs: Kjartansdóttir 11; Asts: Ágústsdóttir 4	Arena: Multieventi Sport Domus

2 June 2017	Iceland	59–44	Luxembourg	Serravalle
12:30	Scoring by quarter: 13–9, 18–10, 13–13, 15–12
	Pts: Sverrisdóttir 21; Rebs: Ámundadóttir 10; Asts: Sverrisdóttir 7	Boxscore	Pts: Mossong 14; Rebs: Mossong, Orban 6 Asts: Hetting, Schmit 4	Arena: Multieventi Sport Domus
