= Icelandic Basketball Association Men's All-Star Game =

- Status: Inactive
- Years active: Periodically until 1988, 1988–2014
- Most recent: 25 January 2014
- Organizer: Icelandic Basketball Association

The Icelandic Basketball Association Men's All-Star Game was a basketball exhibition game hosted by the Icelandic Basketball Association (KKÍ).

== History ==
It was held was held periodically until 1988 when it was held annually to 2014 and featured a mix of the countries star players. The first annual All-Star Game was played at the Hlíðarendi on 27 January 1988. It was last held on 24 January 2014 at the Ásvellir stadium.

The teams selections varied from year to year, with sports journalists selecting the teams during the first years while later teams were selected by fans and coaches. The teams buildup also varied, sometimes splitting the players to teams based on geography (Players from Suðurnes or the Capital Region versus the rest of the country) or pitting domestic players against foreign players.

== Events ==
The All-Star day featured the all-star match between selections, a slam-dunk contest, a three-point contest and a celebrity game.

== Results ==
This is a list of each All-Star Game, the venue at which it was played, and the Game MVP.

Season	Result	Host arena	Host city	Date	Game MVP	Notes
1978–1979	Icelandic players 85 - Foreign players 128	Laugardalshöll	Reykjavík			The Icelandic team was made up of players in the Icelandic national team.
1985–1986	National Team 61 - Press Select 71	Laugardalshöll	Reykjavík			The National Team was made up of players in the Icelandic national team.
1987–1988	Landið 81 - Suðurnes 79	Hlíðarendi	Reykjavík	January 27, 1988	(Iceland) Pálmar Sigurðsson (Haukar)	
1988–1989	Suðurnes 87 - Landið 90	Keflavík	Keflavík	February 25, 1989	(Iceland) Valur Ingimundarson (Tindastóll)	The teams were selected by sports journalists.
1989–1990	Suðurnes 132 - Landið 129	Keflavík	Keflavík	February 9, 1990	(Iceland) Teitur Örlygsson (Njarðvík)	
1990–1991	Suðurnes 147 - Landið 133	Grindavík	Grindavík	February 10, 1991	(United States) Rondey Robinson (Njarðvík)	
1991–1992	Landið 151 - Suðurnes 128	Laugardalshöll	Reykjavík	February 24, 1992	Not selected	
1992–1993	A Group 128 - B Group 157	Hlíðarendi	Reykjavík	February 13, 1993	Not selected	The starting teams were selected by the readers of Morgunblaðið and Dagblaðið Vísir. The All-Star team coaches selected the remaining 7 players on each team.
1993–1994	A Group 143 - B Group 134	Austurberg	Reykjavík	February 12, 1994	(United States) Frank Booker (Valur)	Overtime
1994–1995	A Group 198 - B Group 199	Laugardalshöll	Reykjavík	February 11, 1995	(United States) John Rhodes (ÍR)	Double overtime: 165-165 and 183-183
1995–1996	Domestic 103 - Foreign 116	Smárinn	Kópavogur	February 18, 1996	Torrey John, Tindastóll	
1996–1997	Team Sprite 114 - Team Esso 122	Laugardalshöll	Reykjavík	January 11, 1997	Herman Myers, Grindavík	
1997–1998	Team Sprite 124 - Team Esso 108	Laugardalshöll	Reykjavík	January 17, 1998	(United States) Sherrick Simpson (Haukar)	Teams selected by Benedikt Guðmundsson (Sprite) and Einar Einarsson (Esso)
1998–1999	Team Esso vs Team Sprite	Hlíðarendi	Reykjavík	Postponed	N/A	Game was first postponed due to bad weather and later canceled
1999–2000	Team Sprite 154 - Team Esso 124	Strandagata	Hafnarfjörður	January 15, 2000	(United States) Keith Veney (Njarðvík)	
2000–2001	Team Doritos 131 - Team Pepsi 136	Ljónagryfjan	Njarðvík	January 13, 2001	(United States) (Trinidad and Tobago) Shawn Myers (Tindastóll)	
2001–2002	Team Domestic 105 - Team Foreign 113	Ásvellir	Hafnarfjörður	January 12, 2002	(United States) Damon Johnson (Keflavík)	
2002–2003	Team South 132 - Team North 123	Ásvellir	Hafnarfjörður	January 11, 2003	(United States) Stevie Johnson (Haukar)	
2003–2004	Team South 136 - Team North 133	Seljaskóli	Reykjavík	January 10, 2004	(Iceland) Friðrik Erlendur Stefánsson (Njarðvík)	
2004–2005	Team Domestic 113 - Team Foreign 134	Hlíðarendi	Reykjavík	January 15, 2005	(United States) Clifton Cook (Skallagrímur)	
2005–2006	Team Domestic 109 - Team Foreign 128	DHL-Höllin	Reykjavík		(United States) A.J. Moye (Keflavík)	
2006–2007	Team Domestic 120 - Team Foreign 142	DHL-Höllin	Reykjavík		(United States) Kevin Sowell (Þór Akureyri)	
2007–2008	Team Domestic 137 - Team Foreign 136	Keflavík	Keflavík	20 January, 2008	(United States) A.J. Moye (2) (Keflavík)	
2008–2009	Team Úrvalsdeild 113 - National Team Selection 111	Ásvellir	Hafnarfjörður	20 December 2008	(United States) (Netherlands) Jason Dourisseau (KR)	
2009–2010	Team Iceland Express 129 - Team Shell 134	Dalhús	Grafarvogur	12 December, 2009	(United States) Andre Dabney, Hamar	
2010–2011	Team Landsbyggðin 130 - Team Capital Region 128	Seljaskóli	Reykjavík	11 December, 2010	(Serbia) Lazar Trifunovic (Keflavík)	
2011–2012	Team Capital Region 142 - Team Landsbyggðin 140	Dalhús	Grafarvogur		(United States) Nathan Walkup (Fjölnir)	
2012–2013	Team Icelandair 122 - Team Domino's 148	Ásgarður	Garðabær	21 January, 2013	(United States) Jay Threatt (Snæfell)	Domestic players versus foreign players
2013–2014	Team Icelandair 140 - Team Domino's 116	Ásvellir	Hafnarfjörður	25 January, 2014	(United States) Junior Hairston (Stjarnan)	

== Slam-Dunk winners ==
Year	Winner	Team
1988	(Iceland) Teitur Örlygsson	Njarðvík
1989	(Iceland) Teitur Örlygsson (2)	Njarðvík
1990	(United States) Ron Davis	Grindavík
1991	(Iceland) Guðmundur Bragason	Grindavík
1992	(United States) Samuel Graham	Hetti
1993	(United States) Terry Acox	Akranes ÍA
1994	(Iceland) Albert Óskarsson	Keflavík
1995	(United States) Raymond Harding	Snæfell
1996	(United States) Malcolm Montgomery	Selfoss
1997	(United States) Malcolm Montgomery (2)	Selfoss
1998	(United States) Sherrick Simpson	Haukar
2000	(Iceland) Eiríkur Þór Sigurðsson	Stjarnan
2001	(Iceland) Logi Gunnarsson	Njarðvík
2002	(United States) Cedric Holmes	ÍR
2003	(United States) Stevie Johnson	Haukar
2004	(United States) Kevin Grandberg	ÍR
2005	(United States) Anthony Glover	Keflavík
2006	(United States) Richmond Pittman	Valur
2007		
2008		
2009	(United States) (Netherlands) Jason Dourisseau	KR
2010	(United States) John Davis	
2011		
2012		
2013	(United States) Billy Baptist	Keflavík
2014	(United States) Travis Cohn	Snæfell

== Three-point shootout contest ==
Year	Winner	Team
1988	(Iceland) Hreinn Þorkelsson	Keflavík
1989	(Iceland) Valur Ingimundarson	Tindastóll
1990	(Iceland) Valur Ingimundarson (2)	Tindastóll
1991	(Iceland) Gunnar Örlygsson	Njarðvík
1992	(United States) Joe Baer	KR
1993	(Iceland) Friðrik Ingi Rúnarsson	KR (coach)
1994	(United States) Wayne Casey	Grindavík
1995	(United States) Mark Hadden	Haukar
1996	(Iceland) Teitur Örlygsson	Njarðvík
1997	(Iceland) Baldur Ingi Jónason	KFÍ
1998	(Iceland) Guðjón Skúlason	Keflavík
2000	(Iceland) Teitur Örlygsson (2)	Njarðvík
2001	(United States) Brenton Birmingham	Njarðvík
2002	(United States) Brenton Birmingham (2)	Njarðvík
2003	(Iceland) Herbert Arnarson	KR
2004	(United States) Jeb Ivey	KFÍ
2005	(Iceland) Magnús Þór Gunnarsson	Keflavík
2006	(United States) Jeb Ivey (2)	Njarðvík
2007		
2008		
2009	(Iceland) Guðjón Skúlason (2)	Keflavík
2010	(Iceland) Magnús Þór Gunnarsson	Njarðvík
2011		
2012		
2013	(Iceland) Magnús Þór Gunnarsson	Keflavík
2014	(Iceland) Magnús Þór Gunnarsson (4)	Keflavík

== Topscorers ==
Year	Winner	Points	Team
2006	(United States) A.J. Moye	21	Keflavík
2009	(United States) (Netherlands) Jason Dourisseau	36	KR
2010	(United States) Cristopher Smith	32	Fjolnir
2012	(United States) (Hungary) Darrin Govens	41	Þór Þorlákshöfn
2013	(United States) Jay Threatt	24	Snæfell

== Coaches with most appearances ==
Player	All-Star	Winning editions	Losing editions
(Iceland) Fridrik Ingi Rúnarsson	7	1991, 1992, 1995, 1997, 2000, 2003, 2004	1992
(Iceland) Jón Kr. Gíslason	3	1994	1993, 1996
(Iceland) Valur Ingimundarson	3	2001	1994, 1995
(Iceland) Ingi Þór Steinþórsson	3	-	2000, 2002, 2003
(Iceland) Sigurður Ingimundarson	3	-	1997, 2001, 2005
(Iceland) Sigurður Hjörleifsson	2	1989, 2002	-

== See also ==
- Icelandic Basketball Association Women's All-Star Game

== Sources ==
- Results 1988-2005
