= 1975–76 Úrvalsdeild karla =

Úrvalsdeild karla
- Duration: 8 November 1975 – 27 March 1976
- Games played: 56
- Teams: 8

Regular season
- Relegated: Snæfell

Finals
- Champions: Ármann (1st title)
- Runners-up: ÍR

Awards
- MVP: (Iceland) Jón Sigurðsson

Statistical leaders
- Points: (United States) Curtis Carter

The 1975–76 Úrvalsdeild karla was the 25th season of the Úrvalsdeild karla, the top tier men's basketball league on Iceland. The season started on 8 November 1975 and ended on 27 March 1976. Ármann won its first title by posting the best record in the league. It secured the title by beating KR, 84–74, in the last game of the season.

== Competition format ==
The participating teams first played a conventional round-robin schedule with every team playing each opponent twice "home" and twice "away" for a total of 14 games. The top team won the national championship whilst the bottom team was relegated to Division I.

== Regular season ==
Pos	Team	Pld	W	L	PF	PA	PD	Pts	Qualification or relegation
1	Ármann	14	13	1	1309	1074	+235	26	Champion
2	ÍR	14	12	2	1331	1106	+225	24	
3	KR	14	10	4	1293	1139	+154	20	
4	Njarðvík	14	8	6	1161	1105	+56	16	
5	ÍS	14	6	8	1149	1181	−32	12	
6	Valur	14	5	9	1170	1178	−8	10	
7	Fram	14	2	12	963	1159	−196	4	
8	Snæfell	14	0	14	869	1303	−434	0	Relegated
