= Ingvi Þór Guðmundsson =

Icelandic basketball player

No. 2 – Keflavík
- Position: Guard
- League: Úrvalsdeild karla

Personal information
- Born: 13 July 1998 (age 28)
- Listed height: 194 cm (6 ft 4 in)

Career information
- College: Saint Louis (2018–2019)
- Playing career: 2014–present

Career history
- 2014–2018: Grindavík
- 2019–2020: Grindavík
- 2020: Dresden Titans
- 2020–2021: Haukar
- 2021: Þór Akureyri
- 2023–2024: Þróttur Vogum
- 2025–2026: Ármann
- 2026–present: Keflavík

Ingvi Þór Guðmundsson (born 13 July 1998) is an Icelandic basketball player.

== Career ==
Ingvi played his first game for the Grindavík senior team at the end of the 2013–2014 season. During the 2017–18 season, he averaged 10.8 points per game. The following season, he joined Saint Louis University. During his first season he suffered through the bout of appendicitis, lost approximately 10 pounds and missed a considerable amount of practice. He ended up going to a hospital on November 30 and had his appendix removed. He withdrew from the college in January 2019, after appearing in two games, and rejoined Grindavík.

After averaging a career high of 14.4points, 5.1 rebounds and 5.0 assists during the 2019-20 season, Ingvi Þór signed with Dresden Titans in August 2020. He left the club in October 2020.

In December 2020, Ingvi Þór signed with Haukar. He left the team in February 2021 at the behest of head coach Israel Martín, after appearing in 9 games where he averaged 10.1 points, 3.6 rebounds and 2.9 assists, and joined Þór Akureyri. He appeared in three games for Þór, averaging 17.3 points, 5.0. rebounds and 3.3 assists before missing the rest of the season due to a concussion he suffered in a game against Stjarnan.

He joined Ármann halfway through the 2025–2026 season, where he averaged 11.1 points in 13 games. He scored a season high 24 points in his second game, making 8 of 12 three pointers. He left the club in November 2026 after averaging 12.0 points and 4,2 rebounds in five games and joined Keflavík.

== Personal life ==
Ingvi Þór is the son of Stefanía S. Jónsdóttir, a former member of the Icelandic women's national basketball team, and Guðmundur Bragason, a former professional basketball player and the highest capped player in the Icelandic men's national basketball team history. His brothers are basketball players Jón Axel Guðmundsson and Bragi Guðmundsson.
