= David Bevis =

American basketball player (born 1973)

Personal information
- Born: May 9, 1973 (age 53) United States
- Listed height: 6 ft 6 in (1.98 m)

Career information
- High school: Rogers (Rogers, Arkansas)
- College: Arkansas Tech (1992–1995)
- Playing career: 1997–1999
- Position: Forward

Career history
- 1997–1998: KFÍ
- 1998: ÍA

Career highlights
- Úrvalsdeild Foreign Player of the Year (1998); Icelandic All-Star (1998); 2× NAIA All-First Team (1994, 1995); 2× AIC All-First Team (1994, 1995)

David Bevis (born May 9, 1973) is an American former basketball player. He played college basketball for Arkansas Tech University before going on to play professionally in Europe.

== Playing career ==
=== High school ===
Bevis attended Rogers High School in Rogers, Arkansas and played with the schools basketball team. In 2015 he was inducted into its athletic hall of fame.

=== College career ===
Bevis played college basketball for Arkansas Tech University from 1992 to 1995 where he scored 1,831 career points, including 799 points as a senior. In 1995, he led ATU to the NAIA tournament semifinals for the first time in 40 years after scoring 26 points in a 87–67 victory against Montana State-Northern. He was selected to the NAIA and AIC All-First Team in both 1994 and 1995.

=== Professional career ===
In July 1997, Bevis signed with Úrvalsdeild karla club KFÍ. On 6 March 1998, he scored a three pointer at the buzzer, helping KFÍ beat Haukar 87–86. Overall Bevis had a standout season for KFÍ, averaging 28.5 points, 10.9 rebounds and 3.3 assists per game in the Úrvalsdeild, leading KFÍ to the playoffs for the first time in its history. In January he was selected to the Icelandic All-Star game and after the season he was named the Úrvalsdeild Foreign Player of the Year. In the Icelandic Cup, he helped KFÍ reach the Finals in Laugardalshöll where the team eventually lost to Grindavík.

After initially planning to play for a team in Spain that folded before the start of the season, Bevis signed with ÍA, in October 1998. On 12 November, he was suspended for one game after tossing a water bottle at a wall after a loss against Þór Akureyri which resulted in water hitting referees and staff at the scorers table. In end of November, ÍA released both Bevis and Victor Pereira in a roster overhaul in what turned out to be an unpopular decision by head coach Alexander Ermolinskij. In the Úrvalsdeild, Bevis averaged 27.0 points and 11.6 rebounds for ÍA.

In June 1999, Bevis signed with Þór Akureyri. A month later it was reported that he had left the team for personal reasons.
