= Bob Starr (basketball) =

American basketball player, coach, and executive

Robert Starr
Personal information
- Born: c.1949

Career history

Coaching
- 1979–1980: Ármann
- 1979–1980: Fram
- 1980: Skallagrímur's (assistant)

Career highlights
- As coach: 1 deild karla winner (1980)

Robert "Bob" Starr (born c.1949) is an American former basketball coach and sports agent who represented many of the first American basketball players to play professionally in Iceland in the late 1970s and early 1980s, including Jimmy Rogers, Curtis Carter and former American Basketball Association star Stew Johnson.

== Early life ==
Starr grew up in Houston, USA.

== Coaching career ==
In 1979, Starr was hired as the coach of Ármann, which was then in the second-tier 1. deild karla. Despite the departure of many key players, he led Ármann's team to victory in the league and promotion to the top-tier Úrvalsdeild karla. Along with coaching Ármann, Starr temporarily took over Fram in the Úrvalsdeild karla in December 1979 after John Johnson resigned and managed the team until January 1980. He continued to coaching Ármann in the Úrvalsdeild karla at the beginning of the 1980-81 season. After a rough start to the season, he later left the team in November. Subsequently, he assisted Ívar DeCarsta Webster, Skallagrímur's player-coach, in several games. Following his time in Iceland, Starr headed to Denmark before continuing his coaching career in the United States.

Coach Bob Starr placed basketball players on coached teams, programs, camps and clinics in the following countries: Mexico, Brazil, Argentina, Venezuela, England, Finland, Sweden, Iceland, Norway, Denmark, Belgium, Germany, Turkey, Egypt, Austria, and the United States. Coach Starr, after finalizing his overseas career, started a successful private basketball school that covered the entire mountain states of the United States, Utah, Nevada, Idaho, Wyoming, and Montana.

Coach Bob Starr also became The Community Outreach Head Basketball Coach and Program Director for the Utah Jazz of the NBA, - Managing & Preforming all clinics, camps, and outreach community programs from 1984-1986. During which time Coach Starr was defined and described as a great individual skills development specialist to the sport of basketball on Official Utah Jazz and NBA Media Materials.

One of Coach Bob Starr's coaching accomplishments was that he was a pioneer and forerunner in the early stages in and of the realm of Therapeutic Basketball .
