= John Rhodes (basketball) =

American basketball player and coach

Personal information
- Born: September 25, 1965 (age 61) Milwaukee, Wisconsin, U.S.
- Listed height: 206 cm (6 ft 9 in)

Career information
- High school: Milwaukee Lutheran (Milwaukee, Wisconsin)
- College: Ohio (1984–1988)
- Playing career: 1988–1996
- Position: Center

Career history

Playing
- 1991–1994: Haukar
- 1992: →Valur
- 1994–1996: ÍR

Coaching
- 1994–1996: ÍR
- 1996–1997: North Florida (assistant)
- 1997–1999: St. Bonaventure (assistant)
- 1999–2004: Ohio (assistant)
- 2004–2008: Ohio (associate head coach)
- 2008–2009: Northeastern (assistant)
- 2009–2012: Ohio Northern
- 2012–2017: Duquesne (assistant)

Career highlights
- As player: 4x Úrvalsdeild rebounding leader (1992–1994, 1996); 5x Icelandic All-Star (1992–1996); Icelandic All-Star Game MVP (1995); Second-team All-MAC (1988)

Career Úrvalsdeild karla statistics
- Points: 2,789 (20.4 ppg)
- Rebounds: 2,574 (18.8 rpg)

John Kevin Rhodes (born September 25, 1965) is an American basketball coach and former professional basketball player.

== College ==
Rhodes played for Ohio University from 1984 to 1988, averaging 8.9 points and 7.3 rebounds in 102 games. Rhodes served as team captain and was named All-MAC second-team his senior year.

== Playing career ==
Rhodes started his career in Germany in 1988 before playing two seasons in France.

Rhodes joined Úrvalsdeild karla club Haukar in 1991. He was selected to the 1992 Icelandic All-Star game, scoring 8 points. On March 6, 1992, Rhodes scored 31 points against KR in 88-81 victory in the Icelandic Basketball Cup semi-finals and helped Haukar to the Cup finals where his matchup with Njarðvík's Rondey Robinson was highly anticipated. In the Cup finals, Rhodes scored 27 points but was unable to prevent Haukar's loss against Njarðvík.

In September 1992, Rhodes was loaned to Valur for their games against CRO Lyon in the Korać Cup. In his two games, Rhodes averaged 12.5 points and 13.0 rebounds.

He had stellar season for Haukar in 1992-1993, leading the Úrvalsdeild in rebounds, points scored and coming in second in points per game. He helped Haukar reach the 1993 Úrvalsdeild finals where they lost to Keflavík 3-0.

On November 13, 1993, Rhodes grabbed a personal best 30 rebounds against Körfuknattleiksfélag ÍA. He broke his record in 1995 by twice grabbing 31 rebounds in a single game, on November 9 against Tindstóll and on November 26 against Breiðablik. He was named to the 1995 Icelandic All-Star game where he earned its MVP honours.

Rhodes retired in 1996, after five seasons in Iceland.

== Coaching career ==
Rhodes started his coaching career as a player-coach for Íþróttafélag Reykjavíkur. He led the club to the third-best record in 1994–95 with 24 wins and 8 losses. The regular season success did not continue in the playoffs though as the team got swept in the first round by Skallagrímur. During his second season at the helm of ÍR, the club finished seventh in the Úrvalsdeild and lost in the first round to Haukar.

Rhodes spent nine years as an assistant at Ohio University under Larry Hunter and Tim O'Shea. He began as an assistant under Hunter before being named associate head coach by O'Shea prior to the 2004-05 season.

== Personal life ==
Rhodes married his wife, Jackie, in 1995 in Hallgrímskirkja in Iceland.

In February 2015, Rhodes was diagnosed with squamous cell carcinoma, a form of skin cancer. Four days later, while walking in Philadelphia, Rhodes was struck by a car crossing the street, resulting in a six-hour surgery to fix a fractured tibia and fibula in his right leg. For cancer treatment, Rhodes underwent thirty-five radiation treatments and seven chemotherapy sessions over a seven-week span, which caused him to lose about 80 pounds. By late April, the tumor had disappeared.
