= Bragi Guðmundsson =

Icelandic basketball player

Keflavík
- Position: Guard
- League: Úrvalsdeild karla

Personal information
- Born: 7 October 2003 (age 23)
- Listed height: 199 cm (6 ft 6 in)

Career information
- College: Penn State (2023–2024); Campbell (2024–2025)
- Playing career: 2019–present

Career history
- 2019–2021: Grindavík
- 2020: → Selfoss
- 2021–2022: Haukar
- 2022–2023: Grindavík
- 2025: Grindavík
- 2025–2026: Ármann
- 2026–present: Keflavík

Career highlights
- 1. deild winner (2022)

Bragi Guðmundsson (born 7 October 2003) is an Icelandic basketball player who currently plays for Ármann in the Icelandic top-tier Úrvalsdeild karla. He played college basketball for Penn State and Campbell. He debuted for the Icelandic national team in 2026.

== Playing career ==
=== Early career ===
Bragi started his career with Grindavík in 2019. After averaging 10.0 points for 1. deild karla champions Haukar in 2021–22, he rejoined Grindavík where he broke into the main rotation during the 2022–23 Úrvalsdeild season and averaged 10.1 points per game.

=== College ===
The following season, he joined the Penn State where he appeared in 7 games during the 2023–2024. He transferred to Campbell in 2024 and averaged 5.8 points in 17 games, including two starts, in 2024–2025.

=== Return to Iceland ===
In January 2025 he rejoined Grindavík and finished out the season with them.

In June 2025, Bragi signed with newly promoted Ármann. He had a breakout season for Ármann, averaging career highs of 21.9 points, 5.5 rebounds and 3.5 assists per game. His point total of 481 points was the third highest of any player in the league.

In June 2026, Bragi signed with Keflavík.

== National team career ==
Bragi debuted with the Icelandic national team on 2 July 2026.

== Personal life ==
Bragi is the son of Stefanía S. Jónsdóttir, a former member of the Icelandic women's national basketball team, and Guðmundur Bragason, a former professional basketball player and the highest capped player in the Icelandic men's national basketball team history. His older brothers are basketball playrs Jón Axel Guðmundsson and Ingvi Þór Guðmundsson.
