= Icelandic Basketball Player of the Year =

Basketball award

- Sport: Basketball
- Local name: Körfuknattleiksfólk ársins
- Country: Iceland
- Presented by: Icelandic Basketball Association

History
- First award: 1973
- First winner: Kristinn Jörundsson
- Most wins: (M) Jón A. Stefánsson (12x) (W) Helena Sverrisdóttir (12x)
- Most recent: (M) Tryggvi Hlinason (W) Sara Rún Hinriksdóttir
- Website: kki.is

The Icelandic Basketball Player of the Year award was established in 1973 to recognize the best Icelandic basketball player of the year. The winners are basketball players who have Icelandic citizenship, and whose performances with its sports club and/or national team throughout the year has reached the highest level of excellence. All players with Icelandic citizenship, regardless of where they play in the world, qualify for the award. The winners are selected by the Icelandic Basketball Association. From 1973 to 1997 there was one award for both men and women. In 1998 the Icelandic Basketball Association decided to select both the men's and women's player of the year.

== All-time award winners ==
=== 1973-1997 ===
Year	Players of the Year	Club(s)
1973	Kristinn Jörundsson	(Iceland) ÍR
1974	Kristinn Stefánsson	(Iceland) KR
1975	Kristinn Jörundsson (2x)	(Iceland) ÍR
1976	Jón Sigurðsson	(Iceland) Ármann
1977	Kristinn Jörundsson (3x)	(Iceland) ÍR
1978	Jón Sigurðsson (2x)	(Iceland) KR
1979	Guðsteinn Ingimarsson	(Iceland) Njarðvík
1980	Torfi Magnússon	(Iceland) Valur
1981	Símon Ólafsson	(Iceland) Fram
1982	Linda Jónsdóttir	(Iceland) KR
1983	Kristján Ágústsson	(Iceland) Valur
1984	Valur Ingimundarson	(Iceland) Njarðvík
1985	Pálmar Sigurðsson	(Iceland) Haukar
1986	Guðni Ólafur Guðnason	(Iceland) KR
1987	Jón Kr. Gíslason	(Iceland) Keflavík
1988	Valur Ingimundarson (2x)	(Iceland) Njarðvík
1989	Jón Kr. Gíslason (2x)	(Iceland) Keflavík
1990	Páll Kolbeinsson	(Iceland) KR
1991	Guðmundur Bragason	(Iceland) Grindavík
1992	Jón Kr. Gíslason (3x)	(Iceland) Keflavík
1993	Jón Kr. Gíslason (4x)	(Iceland) Keflavík
1994	Anna María Sveinsdóttir	(Iceland) Keflavík
1995	Teitur Örlygsson	(Iceland) Njarðvík
1996	Guðmundur Bragason (2x)	(Iceland) Grindavík
1997	Guðjón Skúlason	(Iceland) Keflavík

=== 1998–present ===
Year	Men's Players of the Year	Club(s)	Women's Players of the Year	Club(s)
1998	Helgi Jónas Guðfinnsson	(Iceland) Grindavík	Anna María Sveinsdóttir (2x)	(Iceland) Keflavík
1999	Herbert Arnarson	(Iceland) Grindavík	Guðbjörg Norðfjörð	(Iceland) KR
2000	Ólafur Jón Ormsson	(Iceland) KR	Erla Þorsteinsdóttir	(Iceland) Keflavík
2001	Logi Gunnarsson	(Iceland) Njarðvík	Kristín Björk Jónsdóttir	(Iceland) KR
2002	Jón Arnór Stefánsson	(Germany) TBB Trier	Birna Valgarðsdóttir	(Iceland) Keflavík
2003	Jón Arnór Stefánsson (2x)	(United States) Dallas Mavericks	Signý Hermannsdóttir	(United States) Cameron Aggies & (Spain) Isla de Tenerifes
2004	Jón Arnór Stefánsson (3x)	(Russia) Dynamo Saint Petersburg	Birna Valgarðsdóttir (2x)	(Iceland) Keflavík
2005	Jón Arnór Stefánsson (4x)	(Italy) Carpisa Napoli	Helena Sverrisdóttir	(Iceland) Haukar
2006	Brenton Birmingham	(Iceland) Njarðvík	Helena Sverrisdóttir (2x)	(Iceland) Haukar
2007	Jón Arnór Stefánsson (5x)	(Spain) Pamesa Valencia & (Italy) Lottomatica Roma	Helena Sverrisdóttir (3x)	(Iceland) Haukar & (United States) TCU Horned Frogs
2008	Jón Arnór Stefánsson (6x)	(Italy) Lottomatica Roma & (Iceland) KR	Helena Sverrisdóttir (4x)	(United States) TCU Horned Frogs
2009	Jón Arnór Stefánsson (7x)	(Iceland) KR & (Italy) Benetton Treviso & (Spain) CB Granada	Helena Sverrisdóttir (5x)	(United States) TCU Horned Frogs
2010	Jón Arnór Stefánsson (8x)	(Spain) CB Granada	Helena Sverrisdóttir (6x)	(United States) TCU Horned Frogs
2011	Jakob Sigurðarson	(Sweden) Sundsvall Dragons	Helena Sverrisdóttir (7x)	(United States) TCU Horned Frogs & (Slovakia) Good Angels Košice
2012	Jón Arnór Stefánsson (9x)	(Spain) CAI Zaragoza	Helena Sverrisdóttir (8x)	(Slovakia) Good Angels Košice
2013	Jón Arnór Stefánsson (10x)	(Spain) CAI Zaragoza	Helena Sverrisdóttir (9x)	(Slovakia) Good Angels Košice & (Hungary) Diósgyőri VTK
2014	Jón Arnór Stefánsson (11x)	(Spain) CAI Zaragoza & (Spain) Unicaja	Helena Sverrisdóttir (10x)	(Hungary) Diósgyőri VTK & (Poland) CCC Polkowise
2015	Jón Arnór Stefánsson (12x)	(Spain) Unicaja & (Spain) Valencia Basket	Helena Sverrisdóttir (11x)	(Poland) CCC Polkowise & (Iceland) Haukar
2016	Martin Hermannsson	(United States) LIU Brooklyn & (France) Étoile de Charleville-Mézières	Gunnhildur Gunnarsdóttir	(Iceland) Snæfell
2017	Martin Hermannsson (2x)	(France) Étoile de Charleville-Mézières & Champagne Châlons-Reims	Hildur Björg Kjartansdóttir	(United States) UTRGV & (Spain) Legonés
2018	Martin Hermannsson (3x)	(France) Champagne Châlons-Reims & (Germany) Alba Berlin	Hildur Björg Kjartansdóttir (2x)	(Spain) Legonés & Celta de Vigo
2019	Martin Hermannsson (4x)	(Germany) Alba Berlin	Helena Sverrisdóttir (12x)	(Iceland) Valur
2020	Martin Hermannsson (5x)	(Germany) Alba Berlin & (Spain) Valencia	Sara Rún Hinriksdóttir	(United Kingdom) Leicester Riders
2021	Elvar Már Friðriksson	(Lithuania) BC Šiauliai & (Belgium) Antwerp Giants	Sara Rún Hinriksdóttir (2x)	(Iceland) Haukar & (Romania) CS Phoenix Constanța
2022	Elvar Már Friðriksson (2x)	(Belgium) Antwerp Giants & (Lithuania) Rytas Vilnius & (Italy) Derthona Basket	Sara Rún Hinriksdóttir (3x)	(Romania) CS Phoenix Constanța & (Italy) Faenza Basket Project
2023	Elvar Már Friðriksson (3x)	(Lithuania) Rytas Vilnius & (Greece) PAOK Thessaloniki	Sara Rún Hinriksdóttir (4x)	(Italy) Faenza Basket Project & (Spain) AE Sedis Bàsquet
2024	Tryggvi Hlinason	(Spain) Bilbao Basket	Thelma Dís Ágústsdóttir	(Iceland) Keflavík
2025	Tryggvi Hlinason (2x)	(Spain) Bilbao Basket	Sara Rún Hinriksdóttir (5x)	(Iceland) Keflavík
