= Stevie Johnson (basketball) =

American basketball player (born 1978)

Personal information
- Born: February 24, 1978 (age 48)
- Listed height: 1.98 m (6 ft 6 in)
- Listed weight: 100 kg (220 lb)

Career information
- College: Iowa State (1996–2000)
- NBA draft: 2000: undrafted
- Playing career: 2000–2015
- Position: Power forward / center

Career history
- 2001–2002: Þór Akureyri
- 2002–2003: Haukar
- 2003–2005: Drac Inca Mallorca
- 2005–2006: Palma Aqua Magica
- 2006–2008: Caja Rioja
- 2008–2009: Alimentos de Palencia
- 2009–2011: CB Penas Huesca
- 2011: Libertad Sunchale
- 2012–2015: Crailsheim Merlins

Career highlights
- Úrvalsdeild Foreign Player of the year (2003); 2x Icelandic All-Star (2002, 2003); Icelandic All-Star Game MVP (2003); Icelandic All-Star Dunk Contest champion (2003); 2x Úrvalsdeild scoring champion (2002, 2003); LEB Plata champion (2009); 2x Copa LEB Plata Winner (2009, 2010)

Stevie Jerrell Johnson (born February 24, 1978) is an American former professional basketball player.

== College ==
Johnson played basketball with Iowa State from 1996 to 2000. In 1999–2000 season the team won the Big 12 regular season and tournament titles and went onto the Elite Eight. When his basketball eligibility was up after the 1999–2000 season, he stayed on for one season and tried out for the football team. Johnson hadn't played organized football since his freshman year of high school but made the team, and was a significant contributor at linebacker Iowa State squad which won a school-record nine games and captured the school's first bowl victory

== Professional career ==
Johnson joined Úrvalsdeild club Þór Akureyri inn 2001 and went on to lead the league in scoring while being second in rebounding. In August 2002, Johnson signed with Úrvalsdeild club Haukar. Before the season the club had lost many of its key players and was predicted an 8th-place finish in the league. However, Johnson's stellar play propelled the club to finish with the third best regular season record, earning him the nickname "Stevie Wonder" in the Icelandic press. He once again led the league in scoring, while finishing third in rebounding, and was named the Úrvalsdeild Foreign Player of the year. Johnson was selected to the 2003 Icelandic All-Star game where he scored 39 points and was named the All-Star game MVP, while also winning the dunk contest.

Johnson spent the next eight years in Spain, followed by a stint in Argentina and finished his career with Crailsheim Merlins in Germany's Basketball Bundesliga.
