= Danny Shouse =

American basketball player (born 1958)

Personal information
- Born: October 23, 1958 (age 68) Terre Haute, Indiana, U.S.

Career information
- College: Peru State (1977–1979)
- NBA draft: 1979: undrafted
- Playing career: 1979–1982
- Position: Guard
- Coaching career: 1980–1982

Career history

Playing
- 1979–1980: Ármann
- 1980–1982: Njarðvík

Coaching
- 1980–1981: Njarðvík (men's)
- 1981–1982: Njarðvík (women's)

Career highlights
- As player: Úrvalsdeild Foreign Player of the year (1981); 2x Icelandic league champion (1981, 1982); 2x Úrvalsdeild scoring champion (1981, 1982); Icelandic Division I champion (1980); Icelandic Division I scoring champion (1980); As coach: Icelandic men's league champion (1981)

Career Úrvalsdeild karla playing statistics
- Points: 1,485 (37.1 ppg)
- Games: 40

Career coaching record
- Úrvalsdeild karla: 17–3 (.850)
- Úrvalsdeild kvenna: 2–14 (.125)

Daniel Shouse (born October 23, 1958) is an American former professional basketball player who won two Icelandic championships with Úrvalsdeild club Njarðvík in 1981 and 1982.

He set the Icelandic single game scoring record in 1979 when he scored 100 points in a Division I game.

== College ==
Shouse played for Peru State College from 1977 to 1979 and left as their all-time leading scorer with 1,867 points. He was inducted into the school's hall of fame in 1998.

== Playing career ==
Shouse joined the Ármann of the Icelandic second-tier Division I in 1979. He first played during the Reykjavík basketball tournament, where he scored 64 and 70 points in his first two games.

On December 1, 1979, Shouse scored 100 points for Ármann in a Division I game against Skallagrímur, setting the Icelandic single game scoring record. In January 1980 he scored 76 points in an overtime loss against Grindavík and in February he broke the 70 point barrier again, scoring 72 points against Þór Akureyri. In 10 games, he scored 648 points for an average of 64.8 points per game. His scoring prowess helped Ármann win Division I and achieve promotion to the Úrvalsdeild. Even though Shouse played in the nations tier 2 league during his first season, he was widely regarded as one of the best players in the country and finished third in the vote for Foreign Player of the Year.

After the season, Shouse signed with Úrvalsdeild club Njarðvík and helped them win two Icelandic championships, in 1981 and 1982. He led the Úrvalsdeild in scoring both years and was named the 1981 Úrvalsdeild Foreign Player of the Year.

== Coaching career ==
Shouse was a player-coach for Njarðvík during the 1980–1981 season, leading them to a 17–3 record and the national championship. He coached Njarðvík's women's team during the 1981-1982 Úrvalsdeild kvenna season.

== Personal life ==
Shouse was raised in a home with 13 siblings. Two of his brothers also played in the Úrvalsdeild karla. Darrell Shouse played for Fram Reykjavík during the later half of the 1979–1980 season, averaging 21.3 points per game, and Douglas Shouse played the first half of the 1990–1991 season, averaging 27.9 points and 7.6 rebounds. His son, Derek Daniel Shouse, played for Körfuknattleiksfélag ÍA in the Icelandic Division I from 2016 to 2017.

== See also ==
- List of basketball players who have scored 100 points in a single game
