= Milton Bell =

American basketball player

Personal information
- Born: August 21, 1970 (age 56) Dominican Republic
- Listed height: 6 ft 7 in (2.01 m)
- Listed weight: 240 lb (109 kg)

Career information
- High school: John Marshall (Richmond, Virginia)
- College: Georgetown (1988–1990)
- NBA draft: 1992: undrafted
- Playing career: 1993–2006; 2009–2011
- Position: Forward
- Number: 8

Career history

Playing
- 1993: Tri-City Chinook
- 1995: KR
- 1995–1996: ÍA
- 1996: Universidad de Concepcion
- 1997–1998: Indepediente de Pico
- 1998: Guaiqueries de Margarita
- 1998–1999: Quilmes de Mar del Plata
- 1999: Panteras de Miranda
- 2000: Pueblo Nuevo
- 2000–2001: Quilmes de Mar del Plata
- 2002: Club Atlético Welcome
- 2002: Guaiqueries de Margarita
- 2002–2003: MM Beer Cherno More
- 2003: Frailes de Guasave
- 2003: Universidad de Concepcion
- 2003–2004: Quilmes de Mar del Plata
- 2009: Montreal Sasquatch
- 2009–2010: Quebec Kebs
- 2010: Carmen de Patagones
- 2010: San Martin Marcos Juarez

Coaching
- 1996: ÍA

Career highlights
- Second-team Parade All-American (1988); McDonald's All-American (1988)

Milton Sylvester Bell (born August 21, 1970) is an American former basketball player. After playing college basketball for the Georgetown Hoyas, he went on to play professionally in Europe and South America.

== High school ==
Bell played basketball at John Marshall High School in Richmond, Virginia. In 1988, he was selected for the 1988 McDonald's All-American Boys Game and was named to the Parade All-American Second-team after averaging 17 points, 11 rebounds and 9 blocks per game as a senior.

== College career ==
Bell joined Georgetown University in 1988. He played 22 games as a freshman for the Hoyas, averaging 3.4 points per game. He left the team during his sophomore season, in January 1990, after appearing in 10 of Hoyas first 17 games, siding his desire for more playing time. Bell transferred to the University of Richmond 16 days into the start of the 1990 spring semester. The NCAA ruled that he would have two years of eligibility for Richmond's basketball team beginning with the start of the 1991–92 season in November. On July 13, 1991, it was announced that Bell had lost all eligibility at Richmond because he was not making sufficient progress towards a degree.

== Professional career ==
Bell signed with Úrvalsdeild karla club KR in February 1995. In his first game with KR, Bell had 33 points and 22 rebounds in a 72–82 victory against Tindastóll on February 16. In his 5 regular season games with the club, he averaged 25.4 points and 19.8 rebounds, helping the struggling team secure a playoff with 4 victories in those 5 games. In the playoffs, KR faced defending champions Njarðvík which had gone 31–1 during the season. After losing the first game in the best-of-three series, KR bounced back in the second game, winning 98–97 behind Bell's 33 points. In the third and deciding game, Njarðvík limited Bell to 10 points and blew out KR, 89–72, securing their spot in the semi-finals. In the three game series, Bell averaged 22.7 points and 14.3 rebounds.

The following season he signed with rival Úrvalsdeild club ÍA. In November 1995, he became the first player in the Úrvalsdeild to register two triple-doubles during one season. In January 1996, he helped ÍA to the Icelandic Cup finals after scoring 29 points in ÍA's 81–70 victory against KR in the semi-finals. In the Cup finals on January 28, ÍA lost to Haukar, 58–85, after trailing by 5 at halftime. On February 12, he took over as interim coach for the rest of the season after head coach Hreinn Þorkelsson resigned. During the season he set the Úrvalsdeild single season record for most points scored with 983 points in 32 games. For the season he averaged 30.7 points, 18.2 rebounds and 5.3 assists per game. He broke the 50 point barrier twice, the only player to do so during the season, and both times in a loss against Valur. On December 3, 1995, he had 50 points and 24 rebounds and on February 11, 1996, he had 51 points and 20 rebounds.

In September 2004, Bell stepped away from basketball to take care of his ailing mother. In November 2009, Bell signed with the Quebec Kebs. In July 2010, Bell returned to Argentine after last playing there during the 2003–2004 season, and signed with Carmen de Patagones. He later joined San Martin Marcos Juarez where he was released in December 2010.

== Later life ==
After his playing career came to an end, Bell started his own basketball school.
