= Úrvalsdeild karla Player of the Year =

Icelandic basketball award

The Úrvalsdeild Karla Player of the Year is an award for the top-tier basketball league in Iceland, the men's Úrvalsdeild. It was first awarded in 1968, to Birgir Örn Birgis, and the first trophy was given by Dave Zinkoff of the Philadelphia 76ers. From 1979, the award has been given to both the domestic and foreign player of the year.

== All-time award winners ==
The following is a list of the all-time Úrvalsdeild Players of the Year winners.

=== 1968-1978 ===
Season	Player	Team
1968	(Iceland) Birgir Örn Birgis	Ármann
1969	(Iceland) Þorsteinn Hallgrímsson	ÍR
1970	(Iceland) Jón Sigurðsson	Ármann
1971	(Iceland) Þorsteinn Hallgrímsson (2x)	ÍR
1972	(Iceland) Birgir Jakobsson	ÍR
1972-1973	Unknown	
1973-1974	(Iceland) Þórir Magnússon	Valur
1974-1975	(Iceland) Kristinn Jörundsson	ÍR
1975-1976	(Iceland) Jón Sigurðsson (2x)	Ármann
1976-1977	(Iceland) Kristinn Jörundsson (2x)	ÍR
1977-1978	(United States) Rick Hockenos	Valur

=== 1979–present ===
Year	Domestic Player of the Year	Club	Foreign Player of the Year	Club
1978–1979	(Iceland) Jón Sigurðsson	KR	(United States) Tim Dwyer	Valur
1979–1980	(Iceland) Guðsteinn Ingimarsson	Njarðvík	(United States) Tim Dwyer (2x)	Valur
1980–1981	(Iceland) Gunnar Þorvarðarson	Njarðvík	(United States) Danny Shouse	Njarðvík
1981-1982	(Iceland) Torfi Magnússon	Valur	(United States) Val Bracey	Fram
1982-1983	(Iceland) Pétur Guðmundsson	ÍR	(United States) Tim Dwyer (3x)	Valur
1983-1984	(Iceland) Valur Ingimundarson	Njarðvík	No foreign players allowed	
1984-1985	(Iceland) Valur Ingimundarson (2x)	Njarðvík	No foreign players allowed	
1985-1986	(Iceland) Pálmar Sigurðsson	Haukar	No foreign players allowed	
1986-1987	(Iceland) Pálmar Sigurðsson (2x)	Haukar	No foreign players allowed	
1987-1988	(Iceland) Valur Ingimundarson (3x)	Njarðvík	No foreign players allowed	
1988-1989	(Iceland) Teitur Örlygsson	Njarðvík	No foreign players allowed	
1989-1990	(Iceland) Páll Kolbeinsson	KR	Not selected	
1990-1991	(Iceland) Magnús Matthíasson	Valur	Not selected	
1991-1992	(Iceland) Teitur Örlygsson (2x)	Njarðvík	(United States) Rondey Robinson	Njarðvík
1992-1993	(Iceland) Jón Kr. Gíslason	Keflavík	Not selected	
1993-1994	(Iceland) Guðmundur Bragason	Grindavík	(United States) Rondey Robinson	Njarðvík
1994-1995	(Iceland) Herbert Arnarson	ÍR	(United States) Lenear Burns	Keflavík
1995-1996	(Iceland) Teitur Örlygsson (3x)	Njarðvík	(United States) Jason Williford	Haukar
1996-1997	(Iceland) Hermann Hauksson	KR	(United States) Damon Johnson	Keflavík
1997-1998	(Iceland) Helgi Jónas Guðfinnsson	Grindavík	(United States) David Bevis	KFÍ
1998-1999	(Iceland) Falur Harðarson	Keflavík	(United States) Damon Johnson (2x)	Keflavík
1999-2000	(Iceland) Teitur Örlygsson (4x)	Njarðvík	(United States) Brenton Birmingham	Grindavík
2000-2001	(Iceland) Ólafur Jón Ormsson	KR	(United States) Calvin Davis	Keflavík
2001-2002	(Iceland) Jón Arnór Stefánsson	KR	(United States) Damon Johnson (3x)	Keflavík
2002-2003	(Iceland) Helgi Jónas Guðfinnsson (2x)	Grindavík	(United States) Stevie Johnson	Haukar
2003-2004	(Iceland) Páll Axel Vilbergsson	Grindavík	(United States) Darrel Lewis	Grindavík
2004-2005	(Iceland) Sigurður Þorvaldsson	Snæfell	(United States) Joshua Helm	KFÍ
2005-2006	(Iceland) Friðrik Stefánsson	Njarðvík	(United States) A. J. Moye	Keflavík
2006-2007	(Iceland) (United States) Brenton Birmingham	Njarðvík	(United States) Tyson Patterson	KR
2007-2008	(Iceland) Hlynur Bæringsson	Snæfell	(United States) Darrell Flake	Skallagrímur
2008-2009	(Iceland) Jón Arnór Stefánsson (2x)	KR	(United States) Nick Bradford	Grindavík
2009-2010	(Iceland) Hlynur Bæringsson (2x)	Snæfell	(United States) Justin Shouse	Stjarnan
2010-2011	(Iceland) Pavel Ermolinskij	KR	(United States) Marcus Walker	KR
2011-2012	(Iceland) (United States) Justin Shouse	Stjarnan	(United States) J'Nathan Bullock	Grindavík
2012-2013	(Iceland) (United States) Justin Shouse (2x)	Stjarnan	(United States) Aaron Broussard	Grindavík
2013-2014	(Iceland) Martin Hermannsson	KR	(United States) Michael Craion	Keflavík
2014-2015	(Iceland) Pavel Ermolinskij (2x)	KR	(United States) Michael Craion (2x)	KR
2015-2016	(Iceland) Haukur Helgi Pálsson	Njarðvík	(United States) Michael Craion (3x)	KR
2016-2017	(Iceland) Jón Arnór Stefánsson (3x)	KR	(United States) Amin Stevens	Keflavík
2017-2018	(Iceland) Kristófer Acox	KR	(United States) Antonio Hester	Tindastóll
2018-2019	(Iceland) Kristófer Acox (2x)	KR	(United States) Julian Boyd	KR
2020-2021	(Iceland) Hörður Axel Vilhjálmsson	Keflavík	(United Kingdom) Deane Williams	Keflavík
2021-2022	(Iceland) Kristófer Acox	Valur	(Denmark) Daniel Mortensen	Þór Þorlákshöfn
2022-2023	(Iceland) Kári Jónsson	Valur	(United States) Vincent Shahid	Þór Þorlákshöfn
2023-2024	(Iceland) Kristinn Pálsson	Valur	(United States) (Philippines) Remy Martin	Keflavík
2024-2025	(Iceland) Ægir Steinarsson	Stjarnan	(United States) Jacob Falko	ÍR

== Players with most awards ==
Player	Editions	Notes
(Iceland) Teitur Örlygsson	4	1989, 1992, 1996, 2000
(Iceland) Jón Arnór Stefánsson	3	2002, 2009, 2017
(United States) Damon Johnson	3	1997, 1999, 2002
(Iceland) Valur Ingimundarson	3	1984, 1985, 1988
(United States) Michael Craion	3	2014, 2015, 2016
(United States) Tim Dwyer	3	1979, 1980, 1983
(Iceland) Jón Sigurðsson	3	1970, 1976, 1979
(Iceland) Kristinn Jörundsson	2	1975, 1977
(United States) (Iceland) Justin Shouse	2	2012, 2013
(Iceland) Helgi Jónas Guðfinnsson	2	1998, 2003
(Iceland) Kristófer Acox	2	2018, 2019
(Iceland) Pavel Ermolinskij	2	2011, 2015
(Iceland) Hlynur Bæringsson	2	2008, 2010
(Iceland) Þorsteinn Hallgrímsson	2	1969, 1971
