= 1970 Úrvalsdeild karla (basketball) =

1. deild karla^{1}
- Duration: January 4, 1970 – March 21, 1970
- Games played: 30
- Teams: 6

Finals
- Champions: ÍR (10th title)
- Runners-up: Ármann
- Semi-finalists: KR, KFR
- Third place: KR

Awards
- MVP: (Iceland) Jón Sigurðsson

Statistical leaders
Points	(Iceland) Þórir Magnússon	29.2

Records
- Highest scoring: ÍR 96-71 Ármann
- ^{1} The league changed its name to Úrvalsdeild karla in 1978.

The 1970 Úrvalsdeild karla was the 19th season of the top tier men's basketball league on Iceland, then known as 1. deild karla. The season started on January 4, 1970 and ended on March 21, 1970.

ÍR won their tenth title by beating Ármann 2-0 in the playoffs finals for championship. KR finished in third place after beating KFR, two games to none, in a best-of-three series.

Þórir Magnússon led all players in scoring during the regular season, scoring 292 points in 10 games, or 29.2 points per game.

== Competition format ==
The participating teams played each other twice for a total of 10 games. The top four teams would then enter a playoffs for the championship. ÍR won a coin toss with KR for the first seed.

== Regular season ==
Pos	Team	Pld	W	L	PF	PA	PD	Pts	Qualification
1	ÍR	10	9	1	707	560	+147	18	Playoffs
2	KR	10	9	1	663	563	+100	18	Playoffs
3	Ármann	10	4	6	647	649	−2	8	Playoffs
4	KFR	10	3	7	623	673	−50	6	Playoffs
5	Njarðvík	10	3	7	558	659	−101	6	
6	Þór Akureyri	10	2	8	533	627	−94	4	Spared from relegation due to expansion of league.

== Playoffs ==
=== Extra game ===
KFR and Njarðvík ended tied in 4-5th place with 6 points and therefore played an extra game to decide which team would go to the playoffs.

Extra game
KFR	78
Njarðvík	64

=== Bracket ===
Semi-finals
1	ÍR	1
4	KFR	0
2	KR	0
3	Ármann	1

Finals
1	ÍR	2
3	Ármann	0

=== Semifinals ===
Team 1	Score	Team 2
ÍR	79–65	KFR
KR	58–66	Ármann

=== Third place ===
Team 1	Series	Team 2	Game 1	Game 2	Game 3
KR	2–0	KFR	75–68	90–74	

=== Final ===
Team 1	Series	Team 2	Game 1	Game 2	Game 3
ÍR	2–0	Ármann	83–66	96–71	

== Notable occurrences ==
- On March 7, it was reported that KR had added former Indonesian national team player David Janis to the team.
- On March 11, it was reported that KR had added Icelandic national team player Hjörtur Hansson to the team. He had previously been playing with Lugi in the Swedish Division II.
