= Michael Craion =

American basketball player (born 1989)

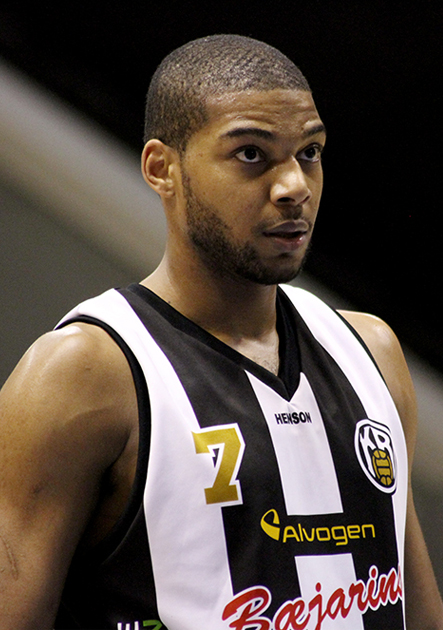
- Craion with KR in the 2015 Icelandic Cup finals

Union Tours Basket Métropole
- Position: Power forward
- League: NM1

Personal information
- Born: August 22, 1989 (age 37) Pennsylvania, United States
- Listed height: 196 cm (6 ft 5 in)
- Listed weight: 93 kg (205 lb)

Career information
- High school: Ruskin (Kansas City, Missouri)
- College: Independence CC (2007–2009); Oral Roberts (2009–2012)
- NBA draft: 2012: undrafted
- Playing career: 2012–present
- Number: 7, 15, 54

Career history
- 2012–2014: Keflavík
- 2014–2016: KR
- 2016–2017: CEP Lorient
- 2017–2018: SVBD
- 2018–2019: Keflavík
- 2019: ADA Blois Basket 41
- 2019–2020: KR
- 2020–present: Union Tours

Career highlights
- 2× Icelandic League champion (2015, 2016); 2× Icelandic Supercup champion (2014, 2015); Icelandic Cup champion (2016); 3× Úrvalsdeild Foreign Player of the Year (2014–2016); 2× Second team All-Summit League (2010, 2012); Summit League Newcomer of the Year (2010); First-team All-KJCCC (2009)

Michael Craion (born 2 August 1989) is an American professional basketball player for Union Tours Basket Métropole of the French NM1.

He won the Icelandic championship in 2015 and 2016, and was widely regarded as the best foreign player in the country, winning the Úrvalsdeild Foreign Player of the year three times.

== College career ==
Craion played two seasons at Independence Community College before playing for Oral Roberts from 2009 to 2012, where he averaged 11.8 points and 6.7 rebounds in 69 games. In 2010, he was a second team All-Summit League and the Newcomer of the Year. He missed most of the 2010–2011 season after breaking his leg.

== Professional career ==
Craion started his professional career in 2012 with Keflavík in the Icelandic Úrvalsdeild. In his first season, he averaged 21.4 points and 13.1 rebounds but Keflavík was knocked out by Stjarnan in the first round of the playoffs. In August, 2013, Craion resigned with Keflavík. For the season he averaged 23.2 points and 12.2 rebounds and was named the foreign player of the year but was unable to prevent Keflavík from being knocked out again by Stjarnan in the first round of the playoffs.

After two season with Keflavík, Craion left and joined defending champions KR in 2014. In his first season with KR, he averaged 24.6 points and 12.4 rebounds, helping the club winning the national championship. For his effort he was named the Playoffs MVP and the foreign player of the year.

He resigned with KR for the 2015–2016 season and helped the club win both the national championship and the Icelandic Basketball Cup. After the season he was named the foreign player of the year for the third straight season.

In August 2016, Craion signed with CEP Lorient in the French NM1 where he averaged 17.7 points and 7.8 rebounds. Prior to the 2017–2018 season, Craion left Lorient and joined NM1's Saint-Vallier. He started 34 of 35 games for Saint-Vallier, averaging 14.1 points and 8.3 rebounds.

On 14 September 2018, Craion returned to Iceland and signed with Keflavík. In 25 regular season and playoff games, he averaged 21.7 points and 10.6 rebounds per game.

On April 24, 2019, he has signed with ADA Blois Basket 41 of the French LNB Pro B.

In August 2019, Craion returned Iceland, signing with his old team KR. In 21 games, he averaged 19.0 points, 9.8 rebounds and 3.8 assists.

In August 2020, Craion signed with Union Tours Basket Métropole of the French NM1.

== Honours ==
=== Iceland ===
==== Club ====
- Icelandic Champion (3): 2014, 2015, 2016
- Icelandic Cup : 2016
- Icelandic Super Cup (2): 2014, 2015
- Icelandic Company Cup: 2014

==== Individual ====
- Úrvalsdeild Foreign Player of the year (3): 2014, 2015, 2016
- Úrvalsdeild Playoffs MVP : 2015
