= Birgir Örn Birgis =

Icelandic basketball player and coach

Personal information
- Born: 23 September 1942 Reykjavík, Kingdom of Iceland
- Died: 11 December 2017 (aged 75) Reykjavík, Iceland
- Listed height: 191 cm (6 ft 3 in)

Career information
- Playing career: 1958–1977
- Position: Forward
- Number: 16

Career history

Playing
- 1958–1977: Ármann

Coaching
- 1976–1977: Ármann (men's)
- 1976–1977: Iceland (men's)
- 1977–1980: ÍS (men's)
- 1980–1981: Haukar (men's)
- 1982–1983: Fram (men's)

Career highlights
- As player: Úrvalsdeild Player of the Year (1968); Icelandic league champion (1976); 2× Icelandic Cup winner (1975, 1976); As coach: Icelandic Basketball Cup (1978); Icelandic Men's D2 champion (1981)

Birgir Örn Birgisson (23 September 1942 – 11 December 2017) was an Icelandic basketball player and coach. He was one of the inaugural players of the Icelandic national basketball team in 1959 and played a total of 33 national team games. He played twenty seasons in the Icelandic top-tier league with Ármann and helped the club to its first and only men's national championship in 1976. In 1968, Birgir was the first player to win the league's Player of the Year trophy, given by Dave Zinkoff.

== Early life ==
Birgir was born in Reykjavík to Birgir Einarsson and Hulda Jónsdóttir. He first played basketball in 1954 when he stumpled into a basketball practice.

== Career ==
Birgir played his first senior team game for Ármann in 1958, at the age of 16, and spent twenty seasons with the club, winning the Icelandic Basketball Cup two times, in 1975 and 1976. In 1976 he helped Ármann break ÍR and KR twenty year monopoly in the national championship by beating KR 84–74 in the championship clinching game. After the season he took over as head coach while suiting up in uniform late in the season due to injuries to key players. In June 1977 Birgir left Ármann and took over as head coach of ÍS.

In 1978, he guided Íþróttafélag Stúdenta to victory in the Icelandic Basketball Cup.

In 1980, Birgir was hired as the head coach of Haukar and led them to Division II championship in his first season and promotion to Division I.

== National team ==
Birgir, at the age of 16, played in the Iceland's first official national team game, against Denmark, in 1959, and in its first 32 official games overall. In 1976, after a six-year hiatus from the team, he played his 33rd and last national team game. He was a co-coach for the national team in 1976, with Kristinn Stefánsson, and in 1977 with Einar Bollason.

== Personal life ==
Birgir was married to Aldís Einarsdóttir and together they had four children.

On 8 November 2000 Birgir's 27-year-old son Einar Örn Birgisson, a former football player, went missing. A week later, Atli Helgason, Einar's business partner and former teammate, confessed to his murder and hiding his body near Grindavík. On 29 May 2001 Atli was sentenced to 16 years in prison for the murder.

=== Death ===
Birgir died in Borgarspítalinn, Reykjavík, on 11 December 2017.
