= Jón Sigurðsson (basketball) =

Icelandic basketball player and coach

Personal information
- Born: 6 March 1951 (age 75) Iceland
- Listed height: 185 cm (6 ft 1 in)

Career information
- Playing career: 1967–1988
- Position: Point guard

Career history

Playing
- 1967-1977: Ármann
- 1977–1985: KR
- 1987–1988: KR

Coaching
- 1982–1986: KR (men's)
- 1982: KR (women's)
- 1986–1987: Haukar(men's)
- 1994–1995: Iceland (assistant)
- 1997–1998: KR (men's)

Career highlights
- As player: 2x Icelandic Basketball Player of the Year (1976, 1978); 2x Úrvalsdeild Player of the Year (1970, 1976); Úrvalsdeild Domestic Player of the Year (1979); 3x Icelandic champion (1976, 1978, 1979); 4x Icelandic Basketball Cup (1975, 1976, 1979, 1984); 2x Úrvalsdeild scoring champion (1971, 1975); As coach: Úrvalsdeild karla Coach of the Year (1998)

Jón Sigurðsson (born 6 March 1951) is an Icelandic former basketball player and the former captain of the Icelandic national basketball team. He was named the Icelandic Basketball Player of the Year in 1976 and 1978 and won the Icelandic championship in 1976, 1978 and 1979. In 2001, Jón was named as one of the twelve best Icelandic men's basketball players of the 20th century.

== Playing career ==
Jón started his playing career with Ármann at the age of 16.

In 1971, Jón led the Icelandic league in scoring, surpassing Einar Bollason and Þórir Magnússon by scoring 46 points in the last game of the season, despite having a fever.

In 1975, Jón led the league again in scoring with 306 total points, passing Kolbeinn Pálsson in the last game of the season. He helped the club win the 1975 Icelandic Basketball Cup and competed in the 1975–76 FIBA European Cup Winners' Cup the next season.

In 1976 he helped Ármann break ÍR and KR twenty year monopoly in the national championship by beating KR 84–74 in the championship clinching game.

In September 1977, Jón left Ármann and signed with rivals KR.

== Icelandic national team ==
From 1968 to 1984, Jón played 120 games for the Icelandic national team. He was the first Icelandic player to play over 100 games for the national team.

== Coaching career ==
Jón coached KR men's team from 1982 to 1986, leading them to the 1985 Icelandic Basketball Cup finals where they lost to Haukar, 73–71. On 17 December 1997 Jón was again hired as the head coach of KR, replacing Hrannar Hólm who was fired after going 4–6 in the first 10 games. Under Jón, KR finished the regular season with ten victories in twelve games and advanced to the Úrvalsdeild finals where it lost to Njarðvík 0–3. After the season, he was named the Úrvalsdeild karla Coach of the Year.

== Team of the 20th century ==
In 2001 Jón was voted to the Icelandic team of the 20th century in basketball as a player.

== Personal life ==
Jón's daughter is the 2001 Icelandic Women's Basketball Player of the Year and former KR player Kristín Björk Jónsdóttir.

== Awards, titles and accomplishments ==
=== Individual awards ===
- Úrvalsdeild Domestic Player of the Year (3): 1970, 1976, 1979
- Úrvalsdeild karla Coach of the Year: 1998

=== Titles ===
- Úrvalsdeild karla (3): 1976, 1978, 1979
- Icelandic Basketball Cup (4): 1975, 1976, 1979, 1984

=== Accomplishments ===
- Icelandic Team of the 20th century
- Úrvalsdeild scoring champion (2): 1971, 1975
