= Terrence Watson =

American-Israeli basketball player

Terrence Watson טרנס ווטסון
Personal information
- Born: March 3, 1987 (age 39) Detroit, Michigan, U.S.
- Listed height: 6 ft 7 in (2.01 m)
- Listed weight: 220 lb (100 kg)

Career information
- High school: Murray–Wright (Detroit, Michigan)
- College: Mott CC (2005–2007); Ole Miss (2007–2008); Ball State (2009–2010)
- NBA draft: 2010: undrafted
- Playing career: 2011–2020
- Position: Small forward / power forward

Career history

Playing
- 2011–2012: ÍA
- 2012–2014: Haukar
- 2014–2015: Maccabi Kiryat Gat
- 2015–2016: Helsinki Seagulls
- 2016–2017: Hapoel Kfar Saba
- 2017: San Miguel Beermen
- 2017–2018: Maccabi Ashdod
- 2018: Rain or Shine Elasto Painters
- 2019: Hapoel Be'er Sheva
- 2020: Hapoel Eilat

Coaching
- 2011–2012: ÍA

Career highlights
- As player: Israeli National League champion (2015); Iceland-D1 champion (2013); Iceland Úrvalsdeild rebounding leader (2014); Iceland Úrvalsdeild blocks leader (2014); NJCAA Division II champion (2007)

Terrence Watson (Hebrew: טרנס ווטסון; born March 3, 1987) is an American-Israeli former professional basketball player. A forward, he played college basketball for Mott Community College, University of Mississippi and Ball State University before playing professionally in Iceland, Israel, Finland, and the Philippines.

== Early life and college career ==
Watson attended Murray–Wright High School in Detroit, Michigan, where he averaged 17 points, 10 rebounds and five blocks per game as a senior. He helped his team to 20-plus win seasons three straight times, including a 21–5 record in his last year. Watson was named second team All-City as a senior and also participated in track and cross country, earning All-City honors in cross country.

Watson started his college basketball career with Mott Community College, where he averaged 12.2 points, 8.4 rebounds, 3.5 assists, 3.4 blocks and 2.8 steals per game, leading Mott to the NJCAA Division II National Championship while also earning Defensive Player of the Year and All-Tournament honors.

Watson played his junior year for the University of Mississippi, where he averaged 1.4 points in 6.7 minutes per game. On November 30, 2008, Watson transferred from Ole Miss to Ball State University but sat out the 2008–09 season per NCAA transfer rules.

In his senior year at Ball State, he finished the season fourth on the team in scoring at 8.3 points per game and was second in rebounding at 6.2 boards per game. Watson led the team and was third in the Mid-American Conference with 39 blocked shots.

== Professional career ==
In 2011, Watson stated his professional career as a player-coach with Körfuknattleiksfélag ÍA of the Icelandic 1. deild karla. In 22 games played for ÍA, he averaged 24.4 points and league leading 15.1 rebounds.

On January 2, 2013, Watson joined 1. deild karla club Haukar. In 10 games played for Haukar, he averaged 22.3 points and 12.1 rebounds. Watson helped the team to promote to the top-tier Dominos League as the 1. deild karla regular season champions.

On April 15, 2013, Watson re-signed with Haukar for the 2013–14 season. On March 28, 2014, Watson recorded a career-high 33 points, shooting 14-of-21 from the field, along with 11 rebounds and three blocks in a 77–81 loss to Njarðvík in the third and decisive game of the Úrvalsdeild first round playoffs series. In his second season with Haukar, he led the league with 14.9 rebounds and 3.2 blocks while also averaging 24.1 points, 2.1 assists and 2.1 steals per game.

In October 2014, Watson joined Maccabi Kiryat Gat of the Israeli National League. In 35 games played for Kiryat Gat, he averaged 16.8 points, 11.5 rebounds and 2.1 rebounds per game, leading Kiryat Gat to win the Israeli National League championship after they defeated Ironi Kiryat Ata 3–2 in a best of five series.

On October 23, 2015, Watson signed with the Helsinki Seagulls of the Finnish Korisliiga. Watson helped the Seagulls to reach the 2016 Korisliiga Playoffs as the seventh seed, but they eventually lost to Tampereen Pyrintö in the Semifinals.

On August 10, 2016, Watson returned to Israel for a second stint, signing with Hapoel Kfar Saba for the 2016–17 season. In 32 games played for Kfar Saba, he averaged 16 points and 10.7 rebounds per game. Watson helped Kfar Saba to reach the Liga Leumit Playoffs as the second seed, but they were eliminated by Hapoel Be'er Sheva in the Semifinals.

On September 11, 2017, Watson signed with San Miguel Beermen of the Philippine Basketball Association (PBA).

On November 15, 2017, Watson joined Maccabi Ashdod of the Israeli Premier League, signing a two-month contract as an injury cover for Gerald Lee.

On October 1, 2018, Watson returned to the Philippines for a second stint, signing with the Rain or Shine Elasto Painters as a replacement for J'Nathan Bullock. In seven games played for the Painters, he averaged 16 points, 11.7 rebounds and 3.3 blocks per game.

On March 7, 2019, Watson returned to Israel for a fourth stint, signing with Hapoel Be'er Sheva. However, on March 18, 2019, Watson suffered an achilles injury in his second game with Be'er Sheva and ruled out for the rest of the season.

== Awards, titles and accomplishments ==
=== Titles ===
- Israeli National League champion (2015)
- Iceland-D1 champion (2013)
- NJCAA Division II champion (2007)

=== Accomplishments ===
- Iceland Úrvalsdeild rebounding leader (2014)
- Iceland Úrvalsdeild blocks leader (2014)
- Iceland-D1 rebounding leader (2012)

== Personal life ==
Watson grew up in Detroit, Michigan. Son of Terrence and Meredith Watson. On March 7, 2019, Watson received an Israeli passport after converting to Judaism.
