= 1952 Úrvalsdeild karla =

Icelandic Basketball Tournament^{1}
- Duration: April 21, 1952 – April 29, 1952
- Games played: 10
- Teams: 5

Finals
- Champions: ÍKF (1st title)
- Runners-up: ÍR

Statistical leaders
- Points: (Iceland) Gunnar Bjarnason

Records
- Highest scoring: Ármann 36–43 ÍS (21 April 1952)
- Winning streak: ÍKF; 4 games
- ^{1} The league changed its name to Úrvalsdeild karla in 1978.

The 1952 Icelandic Basketball Tournament was the 1st season of the top tier men's basketball league in Iceland. The season started on April 21, 1952 and ended on April 29, 1952. ÍKF won the inaugural title by posting the best record in the league. The ÍKF team had the advantage of its close proximity with the Naval Air Station Keflavik and therefore could regularly play competitive games with American players who had high school and college experience. They were furthermore coached by two American naval personnel, Gene Crowley and John Wahl. During the tournament, ÍKF won all four of its games with an average of 10.8 points.

== Competition format ==
The participating teams played each other once for a total of 4 games. The top team won the national championship.

== Regular season ==
Pos	Team	Pld	W	L	PF	PA	PD	Pts	Qualification or relegation
1	ÍKF	4	4	0	155	112	+43	8	Champion
2	ÍR	4	3	1	141	128	+13	6	
3	ÍS	4	1	3	132	139	−7	2	
4	Gosi	4	1	3	105	133	−28	2	
5	Ármann	4	1	3	125	146	−21	2	
