= Einar Örn Birgisson =

Former football player

Personal information
- Date of birth: September 27, 1973
- Place of birth: Reykjavík, Iceland
- Date of death: 8 November 2000 (aged 27)
- Place of death: Reykjavík, Iceland
- Position: Forward

Youth career
- Valur

Senior career*
Years	Team	Apps	(Gls)
1993	Víkingur	3	(0)
1994	Valur	4	(1)
1995	Víkingur	10	(4)
1996–1997	Þróttur Reykjavík	25	(13)
1998	Lyn	9	(0)
1999–2000	KR	6	(2)
2000	HK	9	(6)
- * Club domestic league appearances and goals

Einar Örn Birgisson (27 September 1973 – 8 November 2000) was an Icelandic footballer and businessman. He played football for several years in Iceland and Norway, winning the Icelandic championship and Icelandic Cup in 1999 with KR. In November 2000, he was murdered by his business partner and former teammate Atli Helgason.

== Football career ==
Einar played youth football for Valur. He later played senior football for Víkingur, Valur and Þróttur Reykjavík. He had his breakout season in 1997, finishing tied for third most goals in the Icelandic top-tier league. In 1998, he joined Lyn in Norway. After a good start with the club, he suffered an injury and missed most of the season. He left Lyn following the season due to its financial difficulties where they required him to take a 65% paycut. In 1999, he joined KR where he won the Icelandic championship and the Icelandic Cup. He left the club in April 2000 after a disagreement with manager Pétur Pétursson and later sued KR for the remainder of his salary. He joined HK the same year, scoring 6 goals in 9 matches.

On 7 November 2000, he played for Valur's reserve team, which also included singer Stefán Hilmarsson, in the 32 team stage of the Icelandic Handball Cup, scoring 3 goals in the reserve's team loss to ÍR.

== Death ==
On 8 November 2000, Einar went missing which resulted in a massive search operation in the south part of Iceland. A week later, his business partner Atli Helgason confessed to his murder, having beaten Einar four times in his head with a hammer in Öskjuhlíð in Reykjavík and hiding his body near Grindavík. On 29 May 2001, Atli was sentenced to 16 years in prison for the murder. He was released from prison in 2010. His case was featured in the Icelandic TV show Mannshvörf (e. Disappearances) and Kastljós.

== Personal life ==
Einar was the son of Aldís Einarsdóttir, a former handball player, and Birgir Örn Birgis, one of the inaugural players of the Iceland men's national basketball team.
