= CEP Lorient =

- Leagues: Nationale Masculine 1
- Founded: 1934; 91 years ago
- Arena: Kervaric
- Capacity: 3,800
- Location: Lorient, France
- President: Christian Pasquier
- Head coach: Philippe Maucourant

Cercle d'Éducation Physique de Lorient, commonly known as CEP Lorient, is a French basketball club based in Lorient. The team currently plays in the Nationale Masculine 1, the national third tier league. Established in 1934, the team gained its professional status in 1984.

== History ==
In August 2016, Icelandic international Michael Craion signed with Lorient and averaged 17.7 points and 7.8 rebounds.

== Honours ==
- Nationale Masculine 1 (French Third League)

Champions (1): 1950–51
Runners-up (1): 2017–18

== Notable players ==
Note: Flags indicate national team eligibility at FIBA-sanctioned events. Players may hold other non-FIBA nationalities not displayed.

Criteria

To appear in this section a player must have either:

- Set a club record or won an individual award while at the club
- Played at least one official international match for their national team at any time
- Played at least one official NBA match at any time.

- (France) Louis Bertorelle
  (1 season: 1956–57)
- (United States) Michael Craion
  (1 season: 2016–17)
- (Morocco) Yunss Akinocho
  (1 season: 2012–13)
- (Central African Republic) Destin Damachoua
  (2 seasons: 2015–17)
- (Madagascar) René Rakotondrasolo
