= Kristinn Jörundsson =

Icelandic footballer and basketball player

Personal information
- Born: 13 October 1950 (age 76)
- Listed height: 183 cm (6 ft 0 in)

Career information
- Playing career: 1968–1988
- Position: Guard
- Number: 11

Career history

Playing
- 1968–1983: ÍR
- 1983–1984: ÍS
- 1984–1988: ÍR

Coaching
- 1982–1984: ÍS (men's)
- 1983–1984: ÍR (women's)
- 1984–1986: ÍR (men's)

Career highlights
- As player: 3x Icelandic Basketball Player of the Year (1973, 1975, 1977); 2x Úrvalsdeild Player of the Year (1975, 1977); 7x Icelandic champion (1969–1973, 1975, 1977); Icelandic D1 champion (1984, 1987); As coach: Icelandic Men's D1 champion (1984)

Kristinn Jörundsson (born 13 October 1950) is an Icelandic former basketball and football player who played for both the Icelandic national basketball team and the Icelandic national football team. He won seven national basketball championships as a member of Íþróttafélag Reykjavíkur and one national football championships as a member of Knattspyrnufélagið Fram.

== Basketball career ==
=== Club ===
Kristinn played 19 seasons with ÍR, winning the national championship seven times. He was named the Icelandic Basketball Player of the Year in 1973, 1975 and 1977 and the Player of the Year in 1975 and 1977.

=== International ===
Kristinn played 79 games for the Icelandic national basketball team from 1970 to 1981.

=== Coaching ===
Kristinn was the head coach of ÍS men's team from 1982 to 1984, guiding them to the Division I championship in 1984 and a promotion to the Úrvalsdeild. He coached ÍR women's team during the 1983–1984 Úrvalsdeild kvenna season and helped the team to a second-place finish. In 1984 he was hired as the player-coach of ÍR where he served for two seasons.

== Football career ==
Kristinn Jörundsson
Personal information
- Position: Midfielder

Senior career*
Years	Team	Apps	(Gls)
1970–1972	Fram Reykjavík		
1973	Íþróttafélagið Völsungur		
1974–1980	Fram Reykjavík		

International career
1972–1980	Iceland	2	(0)
- * Club domestic league appearances and goals

=== Club ===
Kristinn won the national football championships in 1972 and the Icelandic football cup twice as a member of Reykjavík-based Knattspyrnufélagið Fram. Over his career, he scored 60 goals in the Icelandic top-tier league. With the exception of a year at Íþróttafélagið Völsungur, he spent all of his career with Fram.

=== International ===
Kristinn played two games for the Icelandic national football team.

== Personal life ==
Kristinn's nephew, Andri Rúnar Bjarnason, was the top goal scorer in Úrvalsdeild karla in 2017. His niece, Rut Jónsdóttir, is a professional handball player and a member of the Icelandic national handball team.
