= Pálmar Sigurðsson =

Icelandic basketball player

Personal information
- Born: 7 February 1963 (age 63) Iceland
- Listed height: 187 cm (6 ft 2 in)

Career information
- Playing career: 19??–1996
- Position: Shooting guard
- Coaching career: 1986–1995

Career history

Playing
- 19??–1991: Haukar
- 1991–1993: Grindavík
- 1993–1995: Breiðablik
- 1995: Haukar

Coaching
- 1986–1987: Haukar (w)
- 1987–1988: Haukar (m)
- 1988–1989: Haukar (w)
- 1989–1990: Haukar (m)
- 1992–1993: Grindavík (m)
- 1993–1995: Breiðablik (m)

Career highlights
- As player: Icelandic basketball team of the 20th century; Icelandic Basketball Player of the Year (1985); 2× Úrvalsdeild Domestic Player of the Year (1986, 1987); Úrvalsdeild Domestic All-First Team (1988); Icelandic All-Star Game MVP (1988); Icelandic champion (1988); 2× Icelandic Basketball Cup (1985, 1986); 1. deild karla winner (1983); 2. deild karla winner (1981); As coach: Úrvalsdeild karla Coach of the Year (1988); Icelandic men's champion (1988); 1. deild karla winner (1995)

Career Úrvalsdeild karla playing statistics
- Points: 3,697 (16.1 ppg)
- Games: 229

Career coaching record
- Úrvalsdeild karla: 32–22 (.593)
- Úrvalsdeild kvenna: 15–21 (.417)

Pálmar Sigurðsson (born 7 February 1963) is an Icelandic former basketball player and coach, and a former member of the Icelandic national team. In 2001 he was named to the Icelandic basketball team of the 20th century by the Icelandic Basketball Association.

== Club career ==
Pálmar started his career with Haukar and helped them win the 2. deild karla in 1981. In 1983, he led Haukar to victory in the 1. deild karla and promotion to the top-tier Úrvalsdeild karla. In 1988 he led Haukar to the national championship after making 11 three-point shots in the fifth and deciding game of the finals against Njarðvík. The same year he was named the Icelandic All-Star Game MVP. He retired early in November 1995.

== National team career ==
Pálmar played 74 games for the Icelandic national team from 1982 to 1992.

== Personal life ==
Pálmar's son is handballer Aron Pálmarsson.
