= Atli Helgason =

Icelandic footballer and lawyer

Personal information
- Full name: Atli Guðjón Helgason
- Date of birth: 7 March 1967 (age 59)
- Place of birth: Iceland
- Position: Midfielder

Senior career*
Years	Team	Apps	(Gls)
1984–1987	Þróttur Reykjavík	45	(9)
1988–1993	Vikingur Reykjavík	106	(12)
1994	Valur	16	(0)
1995	Fram	16	(0)
1996	Víkingur Reykjavík	18	(0)
1997	Valur	15	(0)

International career
1983	Iceland U17	3	(1)
1985	Iceland U19	2	(1)
1991–1992	Iceland	3	(1)
- * Club domestic league appearances and goals

Atli Guðjón Helgason (born 7 March 1967) is an Icelandic lawyer and former footballer who played three games for the Iceland national football team. In 2001 he was sentenced to 16 years in prison for the murder of his business partner Einar Örn Birgisson.

== Football career ==
=== Club career ===
Atli played for 14 seasons and six different clubs in the Icelandic leagues. He was captain of Víkingur Reykjavík when the club won the national championship in 1991.

=== National team career ===
He won three caps and scored one goal for the Iceland national football team between 1991 and 1992.

== Murder of Einar Örn Birgisson ==
On November 8, 2000, 27 year old Einar Örn Birgisson, went missing. Einar, a football player and the son of former basketball star Birgir Örn Birgis, was Atli's business partner and former teammate. A week later, Atli confessed to his murder, having beaten Einar four times in his head with a hammer in Öskjuhlíð in Reykjavík and hiding his body near Grindavík. On 29 May 2001 he was sentenced to 16 years in prison for the murder. He was released from prison in 2010.
