= Kristinn Stefánsson =

Icelandic basketball player (1945–2024)

Kristinn Már Stefánsson
Personal information
- Born: 3 June 1945 Reykjavík, Iceland
- Died: 13 September 2024 (aged 79) Reykjavík, Iceland
- Listed height: 197 cm (6 ft 6 in)
- Position: Center

Career history

Playing
- 1962–1979: KR
- 1981: KR
- 1984: KR

Coaching
- 1976: Iceland

Career highlights
- As player: Icelandic Basketball Player of the Year (1974); 6x Icelandic League champion (1965–1968, 1974, 1979)

Kristinn Már Stefánsson (3 June 1945 – 13 September 2024) was an Icelandic basketball player. He was a key player for KR during their domination in Icelandic basketball in the 1960s and 1970s, where he won the multiple Icelandic championships. In 1974, he was named the Icelandic Basketball Player of the Year. He was a member of the Iceland men's national basketball team from 1964 to 1975, appearing in 34 games.

== Personal life ==
Kristinn had three children with Magnúsína G. Valdimarsdóttir.
