= Guðmundur Bragason =

Icelandic basketball player and coach

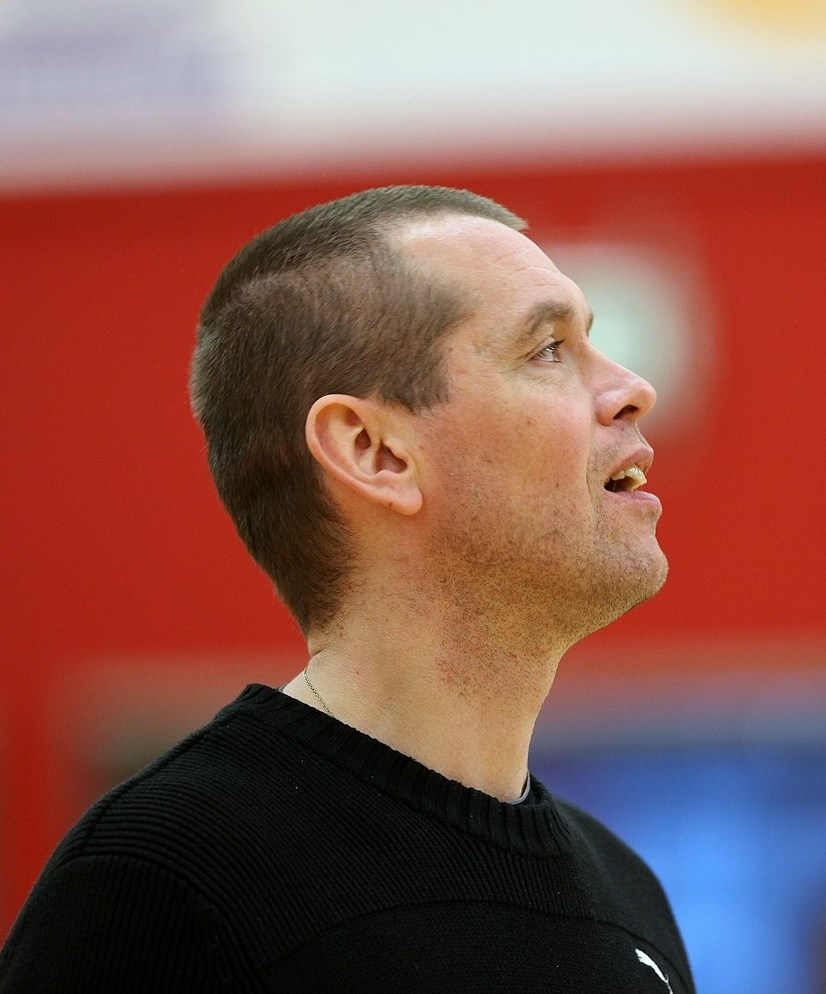
- Guðmundur in January 2009.

Personal information
- Born: 21 April 1967 (age 59)

Career information
- Playing career: 1984–2014
- Position: Center
- Coaching career: 1989–2015

Career history

Playing
- 1984–1996: Grindavík
- 1996–1998: BCJ Hamburg
- 1998: Grindavík
- 1999: Weissenfelt
- 1999–2002: Haukar
- 2002–2004: Grindavík
- 2011–2014: ÍG

Coaching
- 1989–1990: Grindavík (Women's)
- 1993–1994: Grindavík (Men's)
- 1998: Grindavík (Men's)
- 2012–2013: Grindavík (Women's)
- 2015: Grindavík (Men's, assistant)

Career highlights
- As player: Icelandic Team of the 20th century; 2x Icelandic Basketball Player of the Year (1991, 1996); Úrvalsdeild Domestic Player of the Year (1994); 8x Úrvalsdeild Domestic All-First Team (1988–1990, 1992–1996); Icelandic League champion (1996); 3× Icelandic Basketball Cup (1995); Icelandic Supercup (1998); As coach: Úrvalsdeild Men's Coach of the Year (1994); Icelandic Men's Supercup (1998)

Career Úrvalsdeild karla playing statistics
- Points: 5,655 (16.3 ppg)
- Games: 348

Career coaching record
- Úrvalsdeild karla: 27–10 (.730)
- Úrvalsdeild kvenna: 4–14 (.222)

Guðmundur Bragason (born 21 April 1967) is a former Icelandic professional basketball player and coach. He spent most of his career with Grindavík in the Icelandic Úrvalsdeild, winning the national championship there in 1996.

== Icelandic National Team ==
Guðmundur is the highest capped player in the Icelandic national basketball team history, playing 164 games between 1987 and 2003.

== Team of the 20th century ==
In 2001 Guðmundur was voted to the Icelandic team of the 20th century in basketball as a player.

== Personal life ==
Guðmundur is married to Stefanía Jónsdóttir, a former member of the Icelandic women's national basketball team He is the father of basketball players Jón Axel Guðmundsson, Ingvi Þór Guðmundsson and Bragi Guðmundsson.
