= Hildur Björg Kjartansdóttir =

Icelandic basketball player

Hildur Björhg Kjartansdóttir
Personal information
- Born: 18 November 1994 (age 31)
- Listed height: 188 cm (6 ft 2 in)

Career information
- College: UTRGV (2014-2017)
- Playing career: 2009–2024
- Position: Forward
- Number: 5, 6

Career history
- 2009–2014: Snæfell
- 2017–2018: Club Baloncesto Leganés
- 2018–2019: Celta de Vigo Baloncesto
- 2019–2020: KR
- 2020–2022: Valur
- 2022: BC Namur-Capitale
- 2022–2024: Valur

Career highlights
- 2× Icelandic Female Basketball Player of the Year (2017, 2018); 4× Úrvalsdeild Domestic All-First Team (2013, 2014, 2021, 2023); 3× Icelandic champion (2014, 2021, 2023); Icelandic Basketball Cup (2014); 2× Icelandic Supercup (2012, 2014)
Medals
Women's basketball
Representing Iceland
Games of the Small States of Europe
| Silver medal – second place | 2013 Luxembourg | Team |
| Silver medal – second place | 2015 Reykjavík | Team |
| Silver medal – second place | 2017 San Marino | Team |
| Silver medal – second place | 2019 Bar | Team |

Hildur Björg Kjartansdóttir (born 18 November 1994) is an Icelandic former basketball player. She was named the Icelandic Women's Basketball Player of the Year twice, in 2017 and 2018, and was a four time selection to the Úrvalsdeild Domestic All-First Team. During her career, she won the Icelandic championship three times and the Icelandic Cup once.

Outside of Iceland, Hildur played college basketball for Texas–Rio Grande Valley and professionally in Spain and Belgium.

== Career ==
After coming up the junior ranks of Snæfell, Hildur played her first game for the senior team during the 2009-10 Úrvalsdeild kvenna season. During the 2012–13 season, she was selected as a starter in Icelandic All-Star game, where she scored 12 points and grabbed four rebounds. She was a key member of the Snæfell's 2014 national championship team, averaging 15.3 points and 9.9 rebounds during the season.

In 2014, Hildur signed with University of Texas Rio Grande Valley and spent the next three years there. On 24 February 2017 she scored the game winning basket at the buzzer against Seattle University. She played 100 games for UTRGV, with 82 starts, averaging 7.4 points and 6.4 rebounds over the three seasons.

After graduating, Hildur signed with Breiðablik on 27 May 2017. In August, she exercised an escape clause in her contract with Breiðablik and signed with Club Baloncesto Leganés of the Spanish Liga Femenina 2. For the season she averaged 11.5 points and 6.5 rebounds per game, while shooting 40% from the three-point range.

In June 2018, Hildur signed with rival LF2 club Celta de Vigo Baloncesto.

In December 2018, Hildur was named the Icelandic Women's Basketball Player of the Year for the second straight year.

On 13 May 2019, Hildur signed a one-year contract with Úrvalsdeild kvenna club KR. On 13 February 2020 she led all scorers with 37 points in a victory against defending cup and national champions Valur in the Icelandic Cup final four, propelling KR to the Cup finals.

On 13 May 2020, Hildur signed with Valur after KR failed to give her a contract offer or any answers on the future of the team in the aftermath of the coronavirus pandemic in Iceland. On 2 June 2021, she won the national championship after Valur beat Haukar 3–0 in the Úrvalsdeild finals. Following the season, she was named to the Úrvalsdeild Domestic All-First team.

In July 2022, Hildur Björg signed with BC Namur-Capitale of the Belgian Women's Basketball League.

In December 2022, Hildur returned to Iceland and signed back with Valur. The same month, she came in second in the voting for the Icelandic Female Basketball Player of the Year.

On 28 April 2023, she won her third Icelandic championship after Valur defeated top-seeded Keflavík in the Úrvalsdeild finals, 3–1. Following the season, she was selected to the Úrvalsdeild Domestic All-First Team.

On 24 January 2024, Hildur Björg announced her retirement from playing basketball due to repetitive head injuries, including two during the season.

== Icelandic national team ==
Hildur Björg was first selected to the Icelandic national basketball team in 2013, at the age of seventeen, and as of 2017 she has played 19 games for the team. In November 2017 she was selected to the team for the EuroBasket Women 2019 qualification.

== Awards, titles and accomplishments ==
=== Individual awards ===
- Icelandic Women's Basketball Player of the Year (2): 2017, 2018
- Úrvalsdeild Domestic All-First Team (4): 2013, 2014, 2021, 2023
- All-WAC Newcomer Team honors: 2015

=== Titles ===
- Icelandic champion (3): 2014, 2021, 2023
- Icelandic Basketball Cup: 2014
- Icelandic Supercup (2): 2012, 2014
- Icelandic Company Cup: 2012

=== Accomplishments ===
- Icelandic All-Star game: 2013
