= Jón Axel Guðmundsson =

Icelandic basketball player

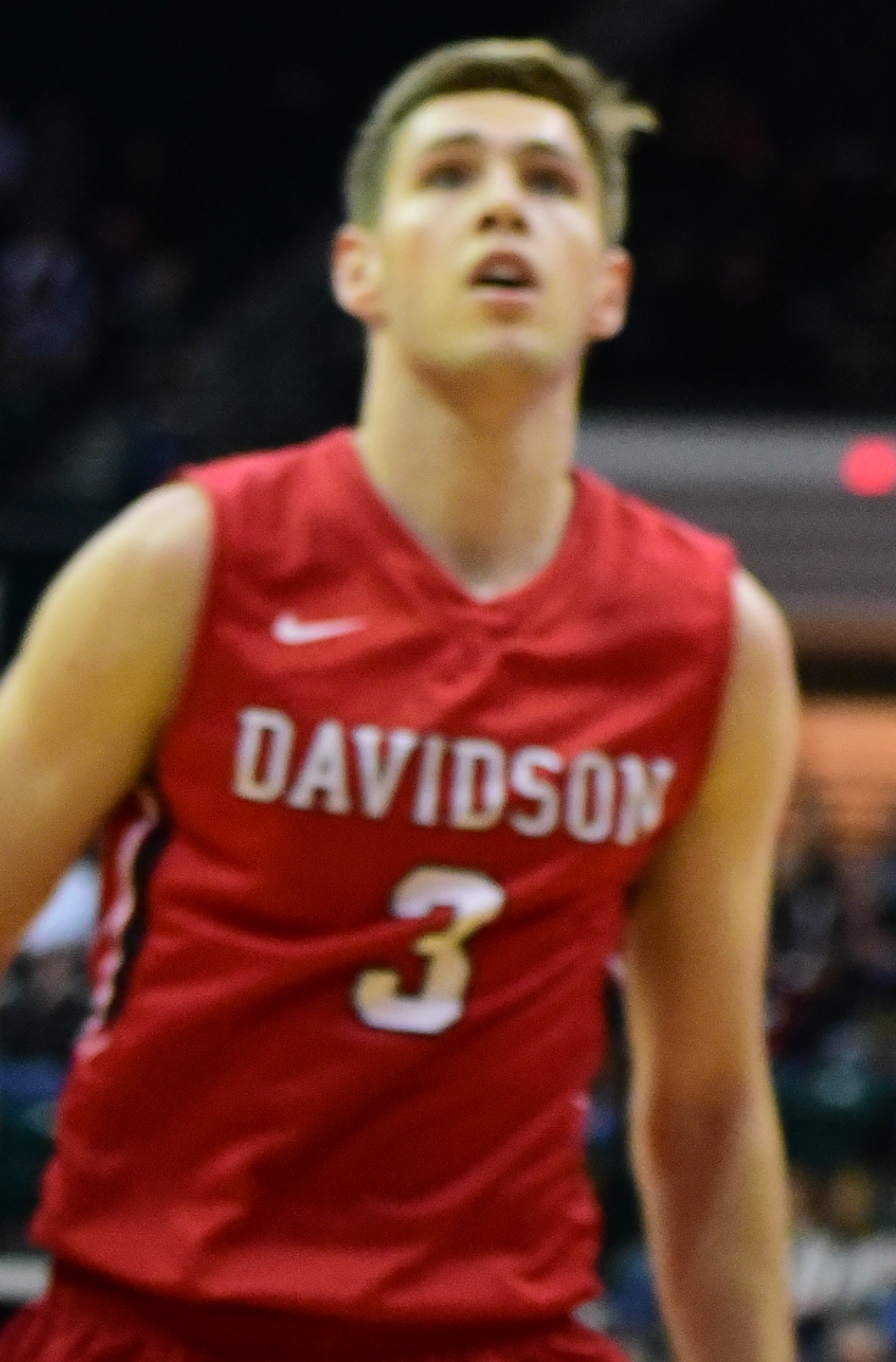

No. 6 – Gran Canaria
- Position: Point guard
- League: Primera FEB

Personal information
- Born: 27 October 1996 (age 29) Grindavík, Iceland
- Listed height: 195 cm (6 ft 5 in)
- Listed weight: 90 kg (198 lb)

Career information
- High school: Church Farm School (Exton, Pennsylvania)
- College: Davidson (2016–2020)
- Playing career: 2011–present

Career history
- 2011–2016: Grindavík
- 2020–2021: Skyliners Frankfurt
- 2021–2022: Fortitudo Bologna
- 2022: Crailsheim Merlins
- 2022: Grindavík
- 2022–2023: Victoria Libertas Pesaro
- 2023–2024: Lucentum Alicante
- 2024–2026: San Pablo Burgos
- 2026–present: Gran Canaria

Career highlights
- Primera FEB champion (2025); 2× Icelandic league champion (2012, 2013); 2× Icelandic Supercup (2012, 2013); Icelandic Basketball Cup (2014); Atlantic 10 Player of the Year (2019); First-team All-Atlantic 10 (2019); Third-team All-Atlantic 10 (2020)
Medals
Men's basketball
Representing Iceland
Games of the Small States of Europe
Bronze medal – third place	2017 San Marino	Team

Jón Axel Guðmundsson (born 27 October 1996) is an Icelandic professional basketball player. He played college basketball for the Davidson Wildcats. He won two national championships with Grindavík in 2012 and 2013 and the Icelandic Basketball Cup in 2014.

== Playing career ==
=== Grindavík ===
After coming up through the junior ranks of Grindavík, Jón Axel played his first senior match with the club in 2011. He won the Icelandic championship with the club in 2012 and 2013 and the Icelandic Basketball Cup in 2014.

=== Church Farm ===
Jón Axel started the 2014–2015 season with Church Farm School, averaging a team best 21 points per game before the Christmas break. In January 2015, he decided to leave the school and return to Grindavík.

=== Return to Grindavík ===
In 12 regular-season games with Grindavík during the 2014–2015 season, Jón Axel averaged 15.6 points and 6.4 assists per game. He had a rough first-round series against eventual champions KR, going scoreless in game two and averaging only 6.7 points in the three-game sweep.

During the 2015-2016 season, Jón Axel continued his improvement, averaging a career high 16.8 points and 8.0 rebounds, along with 5.2 assists per game. He scored a career high 35 points against Keflavík on 8 February 2016. In the playoffs, Grindavík faced KR again in the first round. Jón Axel posted a triple double in the first game, with 10 points, 12 rebounds and 10 assist but despite his performance, KR won 85–67. KR blew out Grindavík in the next two games and completed another three-game sweep for the second year in a row. For the series, Jón Axel averaged 8.3 points, 8.3 rebounds and 5.7 assists.

=== College ===
Jón Axel joined Davidson College in 2016. On 26 December 2016, he was named the Atlantic 10 Conference Rookie of the Week. On 23 November 2017, he was named the Atlantic 10 Conference Player of the Week.

On 11 March 2018, Jón Axel won the Atlantic 10 Conference championship with Davidson and helped the team advance to the 2018 NCAA Division I men's basketball tournament. He averaged 13.2 points, 6.0 rebounds, and 5.1 assists per game as a sophomore.

Coming into his junior season. Jón Axel was named to the Preseason Third Team All-Atlantic 10. On 17 November 2018, Jón Axel scored 33 points in Davidson's 57–53 victory over Wichita State in the opening round of the Charleston Classic. On 26 January 2019, Jón Axel scored 27 points, including two free throws with 5 seconds left, in Davidson's 54–53 victory against Saint Louis. On 22 February 2019, he posted a triple-double, 20 points, 10 rebounds and 10 assists, in a 75–66 victory over Rhode Island. It was the first triple-double for a Davidson player since John Falconi had 17 points, 12 rebounds and 11 assists in 1973. On 25 February he was named the Atlantic 10 Player of the Week after averaging 23.0 points, 9.0 rebounds and 7.5 assists during the week of 18–24 February.

On 12 March 2019, Jón Axel was named the Atlantic 10 Player of the Year as well as being selected to the First-team All-Atlantic 10 after averaging 17.2 points, 7.3 rebounds and 4.7 assists per game for the season.

In April 2019, Jón Axel declared for the 2019 NBA draft. In May 2019, he had workouts with the Sacramento Kings and the Utah Jazz. On 27 May, he announced that he would withdraw from the draft and return to Davidson for the 2019–20 season.

In December 2019, Jón Axel was named to the U.S. Basketball Writers Association watch list for the Oscar Robertson Trophy.

In 2020 he became the first Division I men's player since 1993 to hit career marks of 1,500 points, 700 rebounds, 500 assists, 200 made 3-pointers and 150 steals. At the close of the regular season, he was named to the Third Team All-Atlantic 10.

With the 2019–20 season having been his final season of college eligibility, Jón Axel was automatically eligible for the 2020 NBA draft.

=== Skyliners Frankfurt ===
On 15 July 2020, he signed with the Fraport Skyliners of the Basketball Bundesliga (BBL). For the season, he averaged 12.3 points, 3.1 rebounds and 3.7 assists per game. In July 2021, it was announced that he would play for the Phoenix Suns in the 2021 NBA Summer League.

=== Fortitudo Bologna ===
On 18 August 2021, he signed with Fortitudo Bologna of the Lega Basket Serie A (LBA).

=== Crailsheim Merlins ===
On 18 January 2022 he signed with Crailsheim Merlins of Germany's Basketball Bundesliga.

=== Return to Grindavík ===
In September 2022, he worked out for the Golden State Warriors along with several other veteran players. After contemplating offers from teams in Europe and the G-League, Jón Axel joined Grindavík in October 2022.

=== Victoria Libertas Pesaro ===
On 1 November 2022 he signed with Victoria Libertas Pesaro of the Italian Lega Basket Serie A (LBA).

=== CB Lucentum Alicante ===
In August 2023, Jón Axel signed with CB Lucentum Alicante of the Spanish LEB Oro.

=== San Pablo Burgos ===
Jón Axel signed with San Pablo Burgos ahead of the 2024–2025 season. In April 2025, he helped Burgos secure the Primera FEB championship and promotion to the Liga ACB.

=== Gran Canaria ===
In July 2026, Jón Axel signed with Gran Canaria of the Spanish Primera FEB.

== National team career ==
In 2014, Jón Axel was named tournament MVP of U-18 Nordic Championship after averaging 29.3 points per game for the Icelandic U-18 team. He helped Iceland's U20 team finish second in the 2016 FIBA Europe Under-20 Championship Division B. For his effort he was named to the All-Tournament team.

Jón Axel played five games for the Icelandic men's national basketball team during the 2017 Games of the Small States of Europe. He did not fight for a spot on Iceland's EuroBasket 2017 team due to injuries.

== Career statistics ==
Legend
GP	Games played	GS	Games started	MPG	Minutes per game
FG%	Field goal percentage	3P%	3-point field goal percentage	FT%	Free throw percentage
RPG	Rebounds per game	APG	Assists per game	SPG	Steals per game
BPG	Blocks per game	PPG	Points per game	**Bold**	Career high

=== College ===
Year	Team	GP	GS	MPG	FG%	3P%	FT%	RPG	APG	SPG	BPG	PPG
2016–17	Davidson	31	29	31.8	.411	.327	.733	4.0	3.5	1.1	**.1**	8.2
2017–18	Davidson	33	33	35.8	**.460**	**.406**	.796	6.0	**5.1**	**1.3**	.0	13.2
2018–19	Davidson	**34**	**34**	**36.8**	**.460**	.353	**.826**	**7.3**	4.8	**1.3**	**.1**	**16.9**
2019–20	Davidson	30	30	35.5	.420	.339	.769	7.1	4.3	1.2	**.1**	14.5
Career		128	126	35.0	.441	.358	.791	6.1	4.4	1.3	.1	13.3

=== National team ===
Team	Tournament	Pos.	GP	PPG	RPG	APG
Iceland	EuroBasket 2025	22nd	5	7.0	3.4	2.4

== Personal life ==
Jón Axel is the son of Stefanía S. Jónsdóttir, a former member of the Icelandic women's national basketball team, and Guðmundur Bragason, a former professional basketball player and the highest capped player in the Icelandic men's national basketball team history. His younger brothers are basketball players Ingvi Þór Guðmundsson and Bragi Guðmundsson.

== Awards, titles and accomplishments ==
=== Individual awards ===
==== College ====
- **Atlantic 10 Player of the Year** :2019
- First-team All-Atlantic 10: 2019
- Third-team All-Atlantic 10: 2020

==== National teams ====
- U-18 Nordic Championship MVP: 2014
- FIBA Europe U-20 Championship Division B All-Tournament Team: 2016

=== Titles ===
==== Iceland ====
- Icelandic league champion (2): 2012, 2013
- Icelandic Supercup (2): 2012, 2013
- Icelandic Basketball Cup: 2014
- Icelandic Company Cup: 2011

==== College ====
- Atlantic 10 Conference champion: 2018
