= Rondey Robinson =

American basketball player (born 1967)

Personal information
- Born: May 14, 1967 (age 59) Chicago, Illinois, U.S.
- Listed height: 201 cm (6 ft 7 in)

Career information
- College: Compton CC; Wright State (1987–1989)
- Playing career: 1990–1996
- Position: Center
- Number: 14, 42

Career history
- 1990–1996: Njarðvík

Career highlights
- 3× Icelandic champion (1991, 1994, 1995); Icelandic Cup winner (1992); Icelandic Super Cup winner (1995); 2× Úrvalsdeild Foreign Player of the Year (1992, 1994); Úrvalsdeild rebounding leader (1991); Icelandic All-Star Game MVP (1991)

Rondey Robinson (born May 14, 1967) is an American former professional basketball player. He played six seasons in the Icelandic Úrvalsdeild with Njarðvík, winning the national championship three times.

== College ==
Robinson played college basketball for Wright State under coach Ralph Underhill. He missed his senior season after a knee injury that required surgery.

== Iceland ==
Robinson signed with Njarðvík in 1990 as player-coach. Shortly later the club decided to hire Friðrik Ingi Rúnarsson as head coach instead and let Robinson concentrate on playing. After a rough start, where the club almost let him go, his play improved markedly and at the end of the season Njarðvík won the national championship after defeating arch-rivals Keflavík in the finals. In the deciding game, Robinson had 17 points and 23 rebounds. In 1991 Icelandic All-Star game, Robinson was named the game's MVP.

With 1.4 seconds left of the fifth and deciding game of the 1994 Úrvalsdeild finals against Grindavík, Robinson made one out of two free throws that gave Njarðvík a one point victory, 68-67, and the national championship. After the season he was named the Úrvalsdeild Foreign Player of the Year.

He retired after Njarðvík's loss in the semi-finals of the 1996 Úrvalsdeild playoffs.

== Personal life ==
Robinson grew up in Chicago with five brothers and two sisters.
