= Jimmy Rogers (basketball, born c. 1950) =

American basketball player

Personal information
- Born: c. 1950 Thompson, Texas
- Listed height: 198 cm (6 ft 6 in)
- Listed weight: 90.5 kg (200 lb)

Career information
- College: Texas Southern
- Position: Forward
- Number: 15

Career history
- 1975–1976: Ármann

Career highlights
- Icelandic champion (1976); Icelandic Basketball Cup (1976)

Jimmy Rogers (born c. 1950) is an American former professional basketball player. He and fellow American Curtis Carter, who signed with KR, have been credited for revolutionizing the Icelandic basketball scene after they became the first foreign born professional players in the Icelandic Basketball League in 1975.

== Early life ==
Rogers was born in Thompson, Texas and grew up in Houston with seven of his other siblings.

== Iceland ==
In September 1975, Rogers became the first foreign born professional basketball player in Iceland when he signed a three-month contract with Ármann in preparations for their games against Honka Playboys in the FIBA European Cup Winners' Cup.

His first games for Ármann where during the annual Reykjavík Basketball Tournament. Ármann finished second in the tournament, behind reigning national champions ÍR, and Rogers led all players in scoring with 113 points in five games for an average of 22.6 points per game.

On October 30, Rogers scored 24 points for Ármann in a disappointing 65-88 loss against the Honka Playboys in the first leg of the FIBA European Cup Winners' Cup.

The first meeting between Rogers and Curtis Carter on December 16 was highly anticipated and did not disappoint. It was a tightly played and ended with an 86-81 victory for Ármann. But with 54 seconds remaining in the game, with the score tied at 81-81, Carter got into a fight with Rogers and knocked him down. The punch was caught on a picture and made the front page of Dagblaðið the day after, as well as the headline in Þjóðviljinn "Jimmy won the duel - The Truck won the boxing". Both players received a one-game suspension for the fight from the disciplinary court of the Icelandic Basketball Federation and where threatened with a six-game suspension for any future fights. The verdict was highly criticized, both for the short suspension and for the threat of a longer suspension that only applied to them, as referees were worried that opposing players would try to harass them and goad into a fight.

In the end, Rogers and Ármann came out on the top in the league after beating KR in the last game of the season, guaranteeing them the first place and the national championship. Rogers came second in the race for the scoring title, finishing with 365 points behind Carter's 451 points.

On April 1, 1976, Ármann won Njarðvík, 98-89, in the Icelandic Cup finals behind Rogers 32 points.

Rogers resigned with Ármann the following season, He was again the leading scorer during the Reykjavík Basketball Tournament with 135 points but Ármann again finished second in the standings, this time behind KR.

He was granted a leave of absence from the club in middle of December, with Ármann undefeated in first place, to return to the United States for personal reasons. In January 1977, Ármann announced that he would not return from United States and continue his career.

== Titles, awards and achievements ==
=== Titles ===
- Icelandic champion: 1976
- Icelandic Basketball Cup: 1976

=== Achievements ===
- Reykjavík Basketball Tournament scoring champion: 1975, 1976
