= Terry Acox =

American basketball player

Personal information
- Born: 1969 (age 56–57)
- Listed height: 201 cm (6 ft 7 in)
- Listed weight: 100 kg (220 lb)

Career information
- College: Armstrong State
- Position: Forward

Career history
- 1992–1993: Körfuknattleiksfélag ÍA
- 1997–2004: Ironi Ashkelon

Career highlights
- Icelandic League All-Star (1993); Icelandic League Dunk champion (1993)

Terrance L. Acox (born 1969) is an American former professional basketball player.

== Professional career ==
In September 1992, Acox signed with Körfuknattleiksfélag ÍA in the Icelandic 1. deild karla where he became an instant fan favorite due to his 50-inch vertical leap and high flying dunks. On 29 November 1992, he broke the backboard with a dunk during a game against UMFB in Bolungarvík with 11 minutes remaining. With no replacement backboard, the head referee of the game, Leifur Garðarsson, decided to continue the game using the side baskets and forbade both teams to dunk for the rest of the game. In February 1993, Acox was selected to the Icelandic All-Star game where he scored 26 points. He also participated in the dunk contest which he went on to win convincingly. Despite his on-court dominance, ÍA released Acox in March 1993 prior to the seasons end.

== Personal life ==
Acox is the father of Kristófer Acox, a professional basketball player and member of the Icelandic national basketball team.

After his basketball career came to an end, Acox started working in law enforcement.
