= Christina Grima =

Maltese basketball player

Personal information
- Born: 8 February 1989 (age 37) Pietà, Malta
- Listed height: 1.75 m (5 ft 9 in)
- Position: Small forward

Career history
- 2007-2008: Vis Fortitudo Pomezia
- ?: Sheffield Hatters
- 2011-2012: Alyssa Ashley Loyola
- 2012-2014: Palmares Catania
- 2014-present: Hibernians

Christina Grima (born 8 February 1989) is a Maltese female professional basketball player.
