= Brenton Birmingham =

American-Icelandic basketball player

Personal information
- Born: November 29, 1972 (age 53) New York, United States
- Listed height: 196 cm (6 ft 5 in)
- Listed weight: 92 kg (203 lb)

Career information
- College: Brooklyn (1990–1992); Manhattan (1992–1994)
- Playing career: 1995; 1998–2016
- Position: Guard
- Number: 10
- Coaching career: 1994–1998

Career history

Playing
- 1995: Tapiolan Honka
- 1998–1999: Njarðvík
- 1999–2000: Grindavík
- 2000–2002: Njarðvík
- 2002–2003: Rueil Pro Basket
- 2003: London Towers
- 2003–2008: Njarðvík
- 2008–2010: Grindavík
- 2010–2011: Njarðvík
- 2011–2016: Njarðvík-b

Coaching
- 1994–1998: Manhattan College (assistant)

Career highlights
- Icelandic Basketball Player of the Year (2006); Úrvalsdeild Domestic Player of the year (2007); Úrvalsdeild Foreign Player of the year (2000); 3x Úrvalsdeild Domestic All-First team (2007, 2008, 2009); 3x Icelandic champion (2001, 2002, 2006); 4× Icelandic Basketball Cup (1999, 2000, 2002, 2005); 4× Icelandic Company Cup champion (2001, 2003, 2005, 2009); 4× Icelandic Supercup (2001, 2004, 2005, 2006)
Medals
Men's basketball
Representing Iceland
Games of the Small States of Europe
Gold medal – first place	2007 Monaco	National Team

Brenton Joe Birmingham (born November 29, 1972) is an American and Icelandic former professional basketball player who for the majority of his career played in the Úrvalsdeild karla. He won the Icelandic championship three times and was voted the Icelandic Basketball Player of the Year in 2006 and Úrvalsdeild domestic player of the year in 2007.

== Basketball ==
=== College career ===
==== Brooklyn College Kingsemen ====
Birmingham started his college career with Brooklyn College. There, in 1991-92 he was the top scorer for the Kingsmen, with 15.8 points per game, 7th in the East Coast Conference, and 4th in the conference with 2.4 steals per game, as he shot 50% from the floor.

==== Manhattan College Jaspers ====
After Brooklyn College announced that it was abandoning its basketball program in the spring of 1992, he transferred to Manhattan College, where he played for the Jaspers under head coach and Brooklyn College alum Fran Fraschilla.

In 1993-94 he was fifth in the Metro Atlantic Athletic Conference (MAAC) with 16.1 points per game, and eighth with a field goal percentage of .473. In two seasons with the Jaspers he averaged 13.4 points, 3.5 rebounds, 2.1 assists, and 1.3 steals per game, while shooting 48% from the floor and 40% from three-point range. He was elected to the Jaspers' Hall of Fame in 2010.

=== Club career ===
Birmingham started his professional career in 1995, when he was a late-season addition to Korisliiga club Tapiolan Honka. In 5 games for Honka, he averaged 22.0 points and 4.8 rebounds per game. He spent the majority of his career in the Icelandic Úrvalsdeild karla with Njarðvík and Grindavík, but also played for Rueil Pro Basket in France and the London Towers in England. He twice posted a quadruple-double in the Úrvalsdeild playoffs. On 16 March 2020, Birmingham had 17 points, 14 rebounds, 10 assists and 10 steals for Grindavík in a first round victory against Keflavík. A year later, on 17 April 2001, he had 28 points, 10 rebounds, 11 assists and 11 steals in the championship clinching victory against Tindastóll in the Úrvalsdeild finals.

=== Icelandic national team ===
Birmingham played 19 games for the Icelandic National Basketball team between 2002 and 2007. In 2007, he helped Iceland winning gold in basketball at the Games of the Small States of Europe.

== Acting career ==
In the late nineties, Birmingham auditioned for He got game. In 1999, he appeared in Game Day, starring Richard Lewis.

== Personal life ==
Birmingham lives in Njarðvík in southwestern Iceland with his wife and four children, and works as an air traffic controller at Keflavík Airport.
