= Curtis Carter (basketball) =

American basketball player

Personal information
- Born: c.1950
- Listed height: 207 cm (6 ft 9 in)

Career information
- High school: Sumner (Kansas City)
- College: Missouri Southern; Bishop College (1969–1971)
- NBA draft: 1971: 15th round, 222nd overall pick
- Drafted by: Phoenix Suns
- Position: Center

Career history
- 1975–1976: KR

Career highlights
- Úrvalsdeild karla scoring champion (1976)

Curtis Carter, sometimes spelled Curtiss Carter (born c. 1950), is a former American professional basketball player. Nicknamed The Truck, he and fellow American Jimmy Rogers, who signed with Ármann, have been credited for revolutionizing the Icelandic basketball scene after they became the first foreign born professional players in the Icelandic Basketball League in 1975.

== Early life ==
Carter grew up in Kansas City and played for Missouri Southern State University and Bishop College before being drafted by the Phoenix Suns 15th round of the 1971 NBA draft. He was released by the Suns in mid-June 1971 before playing any game.

== Iceland ==
Carter joined KR in 1975, at the age of 25, after playing in Mexico and Sweden the previous two seasons, and immediately caught the attention of the fans and media with his powerful play and dunks. On November 11, 1975, in a game between KR and Valur, he was issued a warning and later a technical foul for repeatedly dunking the ball during the game, a move that was illegal by the rules at that time. The game officials where also worried that the bolts holding the basket to the ceiling would not be able to sustain his powerful dunks.

The first meeting between Carter and Rogers on December 16 was highly anticipated and did not disappoint. It was a tightly played and ended with an 86–81 victory for Ármann. But 54 second remaining in the game, and the score tied at 81–81, Carter got into a fight with Rogers and knocked him down. The punch was caught on a picture and made the front page of Dagblaðið the day after, as well as the headline in Þjóðviljinn "Jimmy won the duel – The Truck won the boxing". Both players received a one-game suspension for the fight from the disciplinary court of the Icelandic Basketball Federation and where threatened with a six-game suspension for any future fights. The verdict was highly criticized, both for the short suspension and for the threat of a longer suspension that only applied to them, as referees were worried that opposing players would try to harass them and goad into a fight.

In the end, Rogers and Ármann came out on the top in the league after beating KR in the last game of the season, guaranteeing them the first place and the national championship. Carter did beat Rogers for the scoring title, leading the league with 451 points, followed by Rogers with 365 points and Kristján Ágústsson with 337 points.

== Achievements ==
- Úrvalsdeild karla scoring champion: 1976
