= Þórir Magnússon =

Icelandic basketball player (born 1948)

Personal information
- Born: 13 February 1948 (age 78) Iceland
- Listed height: 190 cm (6 ft 3 in)

Career information
- Playing career: 1965–1983
- Position: Guard/forward

Career history
- 1965–1970: KFR
- 1970–1983: Valur

Career highlights
- Úrvalsdeild Player of the Year (1974); 2× Icelandic champion (1980, 1983); 3× Icelandic Basketball Cup (1980, 1981, 1983); 6× Úrvalsdeild scoring champion (1967, 1968, 1970, 1972–1974)

Þórir Magnússon (born 13 February 1948) is an Icelandic former basketball player and the former member of the Icelandic national basketball team. Nicknamed "Rocket Man", he was known as a high scoring guard and led the Icelandic Basketball League in scoring for several seasons.

== Career ==
On 20 February 1967 Þórir scored a league record 57 points for KFR against ÍS, breaking Einar Bollason’s record of 49 points. For the season he led all players in scoring, totalling 311 points for an average of 31.1 points per game.

Þórir led the league again in scoring in 1968, 1970, 1972 and 1973. In 1974, he won his third straight scoring title, setting a then league record in the process with 416 points.

On 17 March 1980 Þórir scored 32 points in a 100-93 victory against KR in the last game of the season, guaranteeing Valur the first place in the league and the clubs first national championship.

== Icelandic national team ==
From 1967 to 1977, Þórir played 46 games for the Icelandic national team.

== Awards, titles and accomplishments ==
=== Individual awards ===
- Úrvalsdeild Player of the Year: 1974

=== Titles ===
- Úrvalsdeild karla (2): 1980, 1983
- Icelandic Basketball Cup (3): 1980, 1981, 1983

=== Accomplishments ===
- Úrvalsdeild scoring champion (6): 1967, 1968, 1970, 1972, 1973, 1974

== Personal life ==
Þórir's brother, Jóhannes Magnússon, played for several seasons in the Icelandic league. He played 15 games for the Icelandic national team from 1974 to 1976.
