= Josephine Grima =

Maltese basketball player

Personal information
- Born: July 24, 1984 (age 42) Pietà, Malta
- Listed height: 1.90 m (6 ft 3 in)
- Position: Center

Career history
- 2005-2007: Libertas Trogylos Basket
- 2007: Palmares Catania
- 2007-2009: Virtus Eirene Ragusa
- 2009-2010: Vis Fortitudo Pomezia
- 2010-2011: Orlando Basket
- 2011-2012: Olympia 68 Basketball
- 2012-2014: Visby Ladies

Josephine Grima (born July 24, 1984) is a Maltese female professional basketball player.
