= Damon Johnson (basketball) =

American-Icelandic basketball player

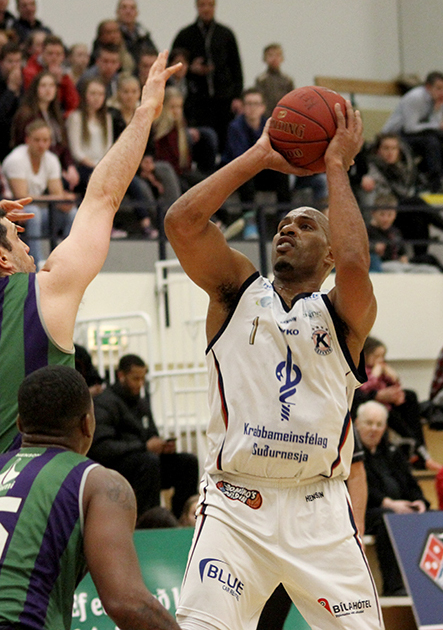
- Damon Johnson with Keflavík in 2015.

Personal information
- Born: March 1, 1974 (age 52)
- Listed height: 1.96 m (6 ft 5 in)

Career information
- High school: Science Hill (Johnson City, Tennessee)
- College: Hiwassee (1992–1993); Tennessee (1993–1996)
- NBA draft: 1996: undrafted
- Playing career: 1996–2015
- Position: Small forward

Career history

Playing
- 1996–1997: Keflavík
- 1997–1998: ÍA
- 1998–1999: Keflavík
- 1999–2000: Los Barrios Cadiz
- 2001–2003: Keflavík
- 2003–2004: Caceres
- 2004: Polaris World Murcia
- 2004–2005: CSF Sevilla
- 2005: Lagun Aro Bilbao Basket
- 2005–2006: Plus Pujol Lleida
- 2006–2007: C.B. Hospitalet
- 2007: Ciudad de Huelva
- 2007–2008: Alerta Cantabria
- 2008–2009: Smoky Mountain Jam
- 2013: Keflavík-b
- 2014–2015: Keflavík

Coaching
- 2010–2012: King University (assistant)
- 2012–2013: East Tennessee State (assistant)

Career highlights
- 2x Úrvalsdeild Foreign Player of the year (1999, 2002); Úrvalsdeild Domestic All-First team (2003); 3x Icelandic champion (1997, 1999, 2003); 2x Icelandic Cup champion (1997, 2003); Spanish LEB All-Star Game (2000); Icelandic All-Star Game MVP (2002)
Medals
Men's basketball
Representing Iceland
Games of the Small States of Europe
Silver medal – second place	2003 Malta	National Team

Damon S. Johnson (born March 1, 1974) is an American former professional basketball player who played in the Icelandic Úrvalsdeild and the Spanish Liga ACB. He won the Icelandic national championship three times and was voted the Úrvalsdeild foreign player of the year twice. A naturalized Icelandic citizen, he played with the Iceland national basketball team in 2003.

== Icelandic national team ==
Johnson played five games for the Iceland national basketball team during the 2003 Games of the Small States of Europe, where he averaged 17.3 points per game, helping Iceland finishing second.

== Coaching career ==
Johnson was an assistant coach for King University from 2010 to 2012 and later for East Tennessee State women's basketball team. In 2019 he was hired as the head coach of Providence Academy in Johnson City.

== Awards and honours ==
=== Iceland ===
- 2x Úrvalsdeild Foreign Player of the year (1999, 2002)
- Úrvalsdeild Domestic All-First team (2003)
- 3x Icelandic champion (1997, 1999, 2003)
- 2x Icelandic Cup champion (1997, 2003)
- 3x Icelandic Company Cup champion (1996, 1998, 2002)

=== Spain ===
- Spanish LEB All-Star Game (2000)
