= Alexander Ermolinskij =

Icelandic basketball player and coach

Personal information
- Born: November 11, 1959 (age 67) Vologda, Soviet Union
- Listed height: 6 ft 10 in (2.08 m)
- Position: Center
- Number: 9

Career history

Playing
- 1983-1985: CSKA Moscow
- 1990-1992: Honvéd
- 1992-1996: Skallagrímur
- 1996-1999: Körfuknattleiksfélag ÍA
- 1999-2000: Grindavík
- 2000-2002: Skallagrímur
- 2002-2003: Selfoss/Laugdælir
- 2003-2005: Körfuknattleiksfélag ÍA

Coaching
- 1996-1999: Körfuknattleiksfélag ÍA
- 1999-2000: Grindavík
- 2000-2002: Skallagrímur
- 2002-2003: Selfoss/Laugdælir
- 2003-2005: Körfuknattleiksfélag ÍA
- 2006-2009: Chevakata Vologda (assistant)
- 2009-2010: Chevakata Vologda
- 2010-2021: Nadezhda Orenburg (assistant)
- 2022-2023: Vologzhanka Vologda (assistant)

Career highlights
- As player: Soviet Champion (1984); Soviet Basketball Cup (1986); Hungarian Basketball Cup (1991); Icelandic Basketball Cup (2000); Úrvalsdeild Domestic All-First team (1997)
Medals
Men's basketball
Representing Iceland
Games of the Small States of Europe
Bronze medal – third place	1997 Reykjavík	National Team

Alexander Pavlovich Ermolinskij (Russian: Александр Павлович Ермолинский; born November 11, 1959) is an Ukraninan-Icelandic basketball coach and a former basketball player. He was an assistant coach for Nadezhda Orenburg from 2010 to 2021. He played for both the Soviet Union national basketball team and Icelandic national basketball team.

== Early life ==
Ermolinskij was born in Vologda in the Soviet Union.

== Playing career ==
After playing for Honvéd for two seasons, where he won the Hungarian Cup in 1991, Ermolinskij joined Skallagrímur of the Icelandic Úrvalsdeild karla in 1992.

Ermolinskij joined Grindavík in 1999 and helped the club win the Icelandic Basketball Cup in 2000.

== National team career ==
Early in his career, Ermolinskij played for the Soviet Union national basketball team. In 1997 he received an Icelandic citizenship and subsequently he was selected for the Icelandic national team that won bronze in the 1997 Games of the Small States of Europe. In total Ermolinskij played 6 games for Iceland.

== Personal life ==
Ermolinskij's younger son, Pavel Ermolinskij, plays for KR, in the Úrvalsdeild karla, and is a member of the Icelandic national basketball team. His older son, Andrei, played two games in the Úrvalsdeild karla for Körfuknattleiksfélag ÍA during the 1998–1999 season.
