= Körfuknattleiksfélag ÍA =

- Leagues: (M) 1. deild karla
- Founded: 1986
- History: ÍA (1986–present)
- Arena: AVAir Höllin
- Location: Akranes, Iceland
- Team colors: Yellow, black
- Head coach: Hjalti Þór Vilhjálmsson
- Website: ia.is

Körfuknattleiksfélag ÍA (lit. 'ÍA Basketball Club'), commonly known as ÍA, is a basketball team based in Akranes, Iceland. It is a subdivision of the sport club Íþróttabandalag Akraness. Its men's team played in the top-tier Úrvalsdeild karla from 1993 to 2000, making the playoffs in 1994, 1997 and 1998. Its women's team played one season in the top-tier Úrvalsdeild kvenna during the 1995–1996 season.

== Men's basketball ==
In 1998, the team became the first 8th seed to defeat the 1st seed in the first round of the playoffs, when it defeated Grindavík 2–1.

=== Recent history ===
On 22 November 2018, American Chaz Franklin scored a career high 53 points in á 94–123 victory against Leiknir Reykjavík. On 16 April 2019, ÍA lost to Ungmennafélag Álftaness in the 2. deild karla finals, 123–100.

On 4 October 2019, Ingimundur Orri Jóhansson scored 50 points for ÍA in a 151–113 loss against Reynir Sandgerði. In ÍA's next game a week later, he scored 59 points in a 143–124 victory against Stál-úlfur. In the same game, Chaz Franklin also broke the 50-point barrier with his 51 points for ÍA.

In July 2021, Hugo Salgado from Portugal replaced Franklin as head coach. On 10 September, ÍA agreed to take a vacant seat left by Reynir Sandgerði's withdrawal in the second-tier 1. deild karla.

In June 2022, the team hired Nebojsa Knezevic as its head coach.

In 2024, Óskar Þór Þorsteinsson was hired as the teams head coach. In March 2025, he led the team to promotion to the top-tier Úrvalsdeild karla for the first time in 25 years.

=== Honours ===
==== Titles ====
1. deild karla

- Winners (1): 1993, 2025

2. deild karla

- Winners (1): 2009

==== Individual awards ====
- Úrvalsdeild Men's Young Player of the Year
  - Bjarni Magnússon - 1996
  - Ægir Hrafn Jónsson - 2000
  - Styrmir Jónasson - 2026
- Úrvalsdeild Men's Coach of the Year
  - Alexander Ermolinskij - 1997
- Úrvalsdeild Men's Domestic All-First Team
  - Alexander Ermolinskij - 1997
  - Dagur Þórisson - 1999

=== Notable players ===
Note: Flags indicate national team eligibility at FIBA-sanctioned events. Players may hold other non-FIBA nationalities not displayed.

Criteria

To appear in this section a player must have either:

- Set a club record or won an individual award while at the club
- Played at least one official international match for their national team at any time
- Played at least one official NBA match at any time.

- (Iceland) Alexander Ermolinskij
- (Iceland) Bjarni Magnússon
- (Iceland) Brynjar Karl Sigurðsson
- (Iceland) Dagur Þórisson
- (Iceland) Ívar Ásgrímsson
- (Iceland) Pavel Ermolinskij
- (Iceland) Sigurður Elvar Þórólfsson
- (Iceland) Ægir Hrafn Jónsson
- (United States) Damon Johnson
- (United States) David Bevis
- (United States) John Johnson
- (United States) Kurk Lee
- (United States) Milton Bell
- (United States) Terrence Watson
- (United States) Terry Acox
- (Serbia) Ilija Đoković
- (United States) Darryl Morsell

=== Notable coaches ===
- (Iceland) Alexander Ermolinskij
- (Iceland) Ívar Ásgrímsson
- (Iceland) Brynjar Karl Sigurðsson 2001
- (United States) Terrence Watson (2011–2012)
- (United States) Chaz Franklin (2018–2021)
- (Portugal) Hugo Salgado (2021–2022)
- (Serbia) Nebojsa Knezevic (2022–2024)
- (Iceland) Óskar Þór Þorsteinsson (2024–2026)
- (Iceland) Hjalti Þór Vilhjálmsson (2026-Present)

== Women's basketball ==
=== History ===
ÍA women's team played the 1995–1996 season in the top-tier league where it finished last with a 1–17 record. It's lone win came against Valur where Sóley H. Sigurþórsdóttir had 26 points and 10 rebounds in ÍA's 66–58 victory.

=== Individual awards ===
- Úrvalsdeild Women's Young Player of the Year
  - Sóley H. Sigurþórsdóttir - 1996

=== Notable players ===
- (Iceland) Auður Rafnsdóttir
- (Iceland) Sóley H. Sigurþórsdóttir

=== Coaches ===
- (Iceland) Jón Þór Þórðarson 1995–1996
