= Ármann (men's basketball) =

- Founded: 1952
- History: Ármann (1952–2000) Ármann/Þróttur (2000–2008) Ármann (2008–present)
- Arena: Kennaraháskólinn
- Location: Reykjavík, Iceland
- Team colors: Blue, red, white
- Championships: 1 Icelandic championship (1976)
- Website: Armenningar.is
| Home | Away |

The Ármann men's basketball team, commonly known as Ármann, is the men's basketball department of Ármann multi-sport club and is based in Reykjavík, Iceland. It won its lone national championship in 1976.

== History ==
Ármann was one of the founding teams of the first Icelandic basketball league in 1952. In 1968, its star player, Birgir Örn Birgis, won the inaugural Player of the Year award. In 1976, Ármann won its first national championship after beating KR 84-74 in the championship clinching game.

On 1 December 1979, Danny Shouse scored 100 points for Ármann in a 1 .deild karla game against Skallagrímur, setting the Icelandic single game scoring record. In January 1980 he scored 76 points in an overtime loss against Grindavík and in February he broke the 70 point barrier again, scoring 72 points against Þór Akureyri. In 10 games, he scored 648 points for an average of 64.8 points per game. His scoring prowess helped Ármann win Division I and achieve promotion to the Úrvalsdeild. Even though Shouse played in the nations tier 2 league during his first season, he was widely regarded as one of the best players in the country and finished third in the vote for Foreign Player of the Year.

The team played in the top-tier Úrvalsdeild during the 1980-1981 season. The team fired head coach Bob Starr four games into the season and replaced him with player-coach James Breeler. The team battled financial difficulties all seasons and Breeler, who led the team with 33.3 points per game, left the team in December due to unpaid salary. The team finished the season on a 11 game losing streak and were relegated back to 1. deild.

On 6 April 2022, Ármann won the 2. deild karla, after winning all 21 league and playoff games, and was promoted to the 1. deild karla.

On 12 May 2025, Ármann gained promotion to the top-tier Úrvalsdeild karla for the first time in 44 years.

== Record ==
=== Úrvalsdeild ===
Ármann played in the top division during the 1952, 1956 and 1960 to 1974 seasons.

| Season | Tier | League | Pos. | W–L | Playoffs | Icelandic Cup |
|---|---|---|---|---|---|---|
| 1973–74 | 1 | Úrvalsdeild karla | 2nd | 11–3 | Runner-up | |
| 1974–75 | 1 | Úrvalsdeild karla | 3rd | 9–5 | N/A | Champion |
| 1975–76 | 1 | Úrvalsdeild karla | 1st | 13–1 | Champions | Champion |
| 1976–77 | 1 | Úrvalsdeild karla | 4th | 9–5 | N/A | |
| 1977–78 | 1 | Úrvalsdeild karla | 8th | 0–14 | Relegated | |
Lower leagues
| 1980–81 | 1 | Úrvalsdeild karla | 6th | 1–19 | Relegated | |
Lower leagues
| 2025–26 | 1 | Úrvalsdeild karla | 10th | 7–15 | DNQ | 2nd round |

=== European record ===
| Season | Competition | Round | Opponent | Home | Away | Aggregate |
|---|---|---|---|---|---|---|
| 1975–76 | FIBA European Cup Winners' Cup | 1Q | (Finland) Honka Playboys | 65–88 | 81–107 | 146–195 |

== Trophies and achievements ==
=== Titles ===
- Úrvalsdeild karla:
  - Winners (1): 1976
- 1. deild karla:
  - Winners (1): 1980
- 2. deild karla:
  - Winners (4): 2000, 2006, 2015, 2022
- Icelandic Men's Basketball Cup:
  - Winners (3): 1965, 1975, 1976

=== Individual awards ===
- Icelandic Basketball Player of the Year
  - Jón Sigurðsson - 1976
- Úrvalsdeild karla Domestic player of the year
  - Birgir Örn Birgis - 1968
  - Jón Sigurðsson - 1970, 1976
- 1. deild karla Domestic All-First team
  - Steinar Kaldal - 2008

== Notable players ==
Note: Flags indicate national team eligibility at FIBA-sanctioned events. Players may hold other non-FIBA nationalities not displayed.

Criteria

To appear in this section a player must have either:

- Set a club record or won an individual award while at the club
- Played at least one official international match for their national team at any time
- Played at least one official NBA match at any time.

- (Iceland) Adama Darboe
- (Iceland) Atli Arason
- (Iceland) Birgir Mikaelsson
- (Iceland) Birgir Örn Birgis
- (Iceland) Björn Christensen
- (Iceland) Björn Magnússon
- (United States) Danny Shouse
- (Iceland) Davíð S. Helgason
- (Iceland) Guðsteinn Ingimarsson
- (Iceland) Hallgrímur Gunnarsson
- (Iceland) Haraldur Hauksson
- (Iceland) Hörður Kristinsson
- (United States) Jimmy Rogers
- (Iceland) Jón H. Steingrímsson
- (Iceland) Jón Björgvinsson
- (Iceland) Jón Sigurðsson
- (Iceland) Lárus Lárusson
- (Iceland) Símon Ólafsson
- (United States) Stew Johnson

== Notable coaches ==
- (Iceland) Birgir Örn Birgis 1976–1977
- (United States) Michael Wood 1977–1978
- (United States) Bob Starr 1979–1980
- (United States) James Breeler 1980
- (Iceland) Birgir Mikaelsson 2003–2004
- (Iceland) Pétur Ingvarsson
- (Iceland) Tómas Hermannsson
- (Iceland) Karl Guðlaugsson
- (Iceland) Ólafur Þór Jónsson 2021–2023
- (Iceland) Steinar Kaldal 2023–present
