= Haukar (men's basketball) =

- Founded: 1971
- History: Haukar; 1971–present
- Arena: Ásvellir
- Location: Hafnarfjörður, Iceland
- Team colors: Red, Blue, White
- Championships: 1 Úrvalsdeild karla
- Website: haukar.is
Home	Away

The Haukar men's basketball team, commonly known as Haukar (Icelandic pronunciation: [ˈhøyːkar̥]), is the men's basketball department of Knattspyrnufélagið Haukar multi-sport club, based in the town of Hafnarfjörður, Iceland.

== Home court ==
Haukar play their home games in Ólafssalur (English: Ólaf's hall) in Ásvellir. The court is named after Ólafur Rafnsson, a former Haukar player and president of FIBA Europe.

== Recent history ==
Haukar where relegate from the top-tier Úrvalsdeild karla at the end of the 2020–2021 season. In March 2022, Haukar secured victory in the second-tier 1. deild and promotion back to the Úrvalsdeild.

== Honors ==
Úrvalsdeild karla

- Winners (1): 1988

Icelandic Basketball Cup

- Winners (3): 1985, 1986, 1996

Division I

- Winners (3): 1983, 2013, 2022

Division II

- Winners (1): 1981

== Notable players ==
Note: Flags indicate national team eligibility at FIBA-sanctioned events. Players may hold other non-FIBA nationalities not displayed.

Criteria

To appear in this section a player must have either:

- Set a club record or won an individual award while at the club
- Played at least one official international match for their national team at any time
- Played at least one official NBA match at any time.

- (Iceland) Bragi Magnússon
- (Iceland) Breki Gylfason
- (Denmark) Daniel Mortensen
- (Iceland) Einar Bollason
- (Iceland) Emil Barja
- (Iceland) Finnur Atli Magnússon
- (Iceland) Guðmundur Bragason
- (Colombia) Hansel Atencia
- (Iceland) Haukur Óskarsson
- (Iceland) Henning Henningsson
- (Iceland) Hilmar Smári Henningsson
- (Iceland) Hjálmar Stefánsson
- (Iceland) Hálfdán Markússon
- (Iceland) Jón Arnar Ingvarsson
- (Iceland) Ívar DeCarsta Webster
- (Iceland) Ívar Ásgrímsson
- (United States) John Rhodes
- (United States) Jónatan James Bow
- (Iceland) Kristinn Jónasson
- (Iceland) Kristján Leifur Sverrisson
- (Iceland) Kári Jónsson
- (Iceland) Pálmar Sigurðsson
- (Iceland) Pétur Ingvarsson
- (Iceland) Ólafur Rafnsson
- (Iceland) Ragnar Nathanaelsson
- (Iceland) Reynir Kristjánsson
- (Iceland) Sigfús Gizurarson
- (Dominican Republic) Steven Verplancken
- (Iceland) Sævar Ingi Haraldsson
- (United States) Terrence Watson
- (Finland) Ville Tahvanainen

== Coaches ==
- (Iceland) Birgir Örn Birgis 1980–1981
- (Iceland) Einar Bollason 1982–1986
- (Iceland) Jón Sigurðsson 1986–1987
- (Iceland) Pálmar Sigurðsson 1987–1988
- (Iceland) Einar Bollason 1988–1989
- (Iceland) Pálmar Sigurðsson 1989–1990
- (United States) Glenn Thomas 1990–1991
- (Iceland) Ólafur Rafnsson 1991–1992
- (Iceland) Ingvar S. Jónsson 1992–1994
- (Iceland) Jón Arnar Ingvarsson 1998–1999
- (Iceland) Ívar Ásgrímsson 1999–2001
- (Iceland) Reynir Kristjánsson 2001–2005
- (Iceland) Ágúst Björgvinsson 2006
- (Iceland) Ívar Ásgrímsson 2011
- (Iceland) Ívar Ásgrímsson 2013–2019
- (Spain) Israel Martín 2019–2021
- (Iceland) Sævaldur Bjarnason 2021
- (Iceland) Máté Dalmay 2021–2024
- (Iceland) Emil Barja 2024 (interim)
- (Iceland) Friðrik Ingi Rúnarsson 2025
- (Iceland) Pétur Ingvarsson 2025–present
