= FIBA EuroBasket 1999 qualification =

Qualification for the 1999 FIBA European Championship, commonly called FIBA EuroBasket 1999 took place between 22 May 1996 and 28 February 1999. A total of fourteen teams qualified for the tournament, joining hosts France and World Champions Yugoslavia.

== Format ==
A total of 39 teams participated. Competition consisted of three stages:

- A Preliminary Round that consisted of six teams that competed in a round robin tournament that took place in Reykjavík, Iceland between 22 May and 26 May 1996.
- A Qualifying Round where the third, fourth and fifth teams from the Preliminary Round joined another thirteen teams. The sixteen teams where divided in four round robin groups of four teams each and each group competition took place in a different city. This stage was hosted by Cyprus, Ireland, Romania and Slovakia and took place between 23 May and 25 May 1997.
- A Semi-Final Round where the first and second teams from the Preliminary Round and from each of the four groups from the Qualifying Round joined another twenty teams. All thirty teams where then divided in five round robin groups of six teams each. This stage took place between 26 November 1997 and 27 February 1999 and competition consisted of home and away legs, taking place in each of the participating countries. The top two teams from each group plus the best four third-placed teams qualified for EuroBasket 1999.

== Preliminary round ==
Qualified for the Semi-Final Round
Qualified for the Qualifying Round

Times given below are in Western European Time (UTC±00:00).

Team	Pld	W	L	PF	PA	PD	Pts
Denmark	5	4	1	476	365	+111	9
Iceland	5	3	2	413	381	+32	8
Ireland	5	3	2	434	407	+27	8
Cyprus	5	3	2	358	366	−8	8
Luxembourg	5	1	4	352	465	−113	6
Albania	5	1	4	361	427	−66	6

22 May 1996
16:00

Boxscore

Albania	65–99	Denmark
Scoring by half: 25–49, 40–50
Pts: Meli 19; Rebs: Mançe, Çapaliku 6 Asts: Kuqo 5		Pts: Jerichow 24; Rebs: Andersen 8 Asts: Baek 9

Laugardalshöll, Reykjavík

22 May 1996
18:00

Boxscore

Cyprus	84–73	Ireland
Scoring by half: 33–36, 51–37
Pts: Stylianides 19; Rebs: Soleas, Stylianides 6 Asts: Soleas, Stylianides 5		Pts: Burke 22; Rebs: O'Connell 12; Asts: Fulton, O'Connell, Powell 3

Laugardalshöll, Reykjavík

22 May 1996
20:00

Boxscore

Iceland	96–63	Luxembourg
Scoring by half: 41–40, 55–23
Pts: Örlygsson 31; Rebs: Bragason 15; Asts: Ingvarsson 7		Pts: Feyder 16; Rebs: Wohl 10; Asts: Wohl 3

Laugardalshöll, Reykjavík
Attendance: 1,000
Referees: Bruno Gasperin (FRA), Tony Colgan(IRL)

23 May 1996
16:00

Boxscore

Albania	77–96	Ireland
Scoring by half: 40–45, 37–51
Pts: Kuqo 29; Rebs: Mema, Kuqo 4 Asts: Kuqo 6		Pts: Powell 25; Rebs: O'Connell 12; Asts: Fulton 6

Laugardalshöll, Reykjavík

23 May 1996
18:00

Boxscore

Denmark	105–72	Luxembourg
Scoring by half: 44–37, 61–35
Pts: Jerichow 18; Rebs: Sinding 11; Asts: Baek 7		Pts: Feyder 22; Rebs: Wohl 7 Asts: Adam 6

Laugardalshöll, Reykjavík

23 May 1996
20:00

Boxscore

Iceland	70–61	Cyprus
Scoring by half: 29–29, 41–32
Pts: Örlygsson 16; Rebs: Bragason 9 Asts: Örlygsson 5		Pts: Stylianides 19; Rebs: Soleas, Karayiannis 7 Asts: Kyriacou 4

Laugardalshöll, Reykjavík
Attendance: 1,800
Referees: Fernand Hengel (LUX), Alexander Faassen (NED)

24 May 1996
16:00

Boxscore

Luxembourg	74–71	Albania
Scoring by half: 46–40, 28–31
Pts: Feyder 30; Rebs: Gruskovnjak 8 Asts: Gruskovnjak 8		Pts: Kuqo 24; Rebs: Çapaliku 10; Asts: Selmani 7

Laugardalshöll, Reykjavík

24 May 1996
18:00

Boxscore

Denmark	98–63	Cyprus
Scoring by half: 39–35, 59–28
Pts: Hjorth 23; Rebs: Jerichow 10; Asts: T. Pedersen 7		Pts: Soleas, Antoniou 10; Rebs: Stylianides, Ashikalis, Antoniou 4 Asts: Stylianides 4

Laugardalshöll, Reykjavík

24 May 1996
20:00

Boxscore

Iceland	89–74	Ireland
Scoring by half: 46–46, 43–28

Laugardalshöll, Reykjavík
Attendance: 1,200
Referees: Alexander Faassen (NED), Jan Gjettermann (DEN)

25 May 1996
16:00

Boxscore

Luxembourg	62–78	Cyprus
Scoring by half: 32–36, 30–42
Pts: Feyder 16; Rebs: Boever 8 Asts: Boever 3		Pts: Karayiannis 17; Rebs: Kyriacou 9 Asts: Stylianides 8

Laugardalshöll, Reykjavík

25 May 1996
18:00

Boxscore

Albania	85–71	Iceland
Scoring by half: 44–33, 41–38
Pts: Kuqo 19; Rebs: Kuqo 9 Asts: Mema 5		Pts: Örlygsson 16; Rebs: Bragason 13; Asts: Bragason, Hardarson, Skúlason 3

Laugardalshöll, Reykjavík
Attendance: 1,000
Referees: Alexander Faassen (NED), Tony Colgan (IRL)

25 May 1996
20:00

Boxscore

Ireland	78–76	Denmark
Scoring by half: 39–39, 39–37
Pts: Powell 27; Rebs: Tomidy 6 Asts: Donnelly, O'Connell 2		Pts: Jerichow 27; Rebs: Andersen 10; Asts: Baek, Hjorth 3

Laugardalshöll, Reykjavík

26 May 1996
14:00

Boxscore

Cyprus	72–63	Albania
Scoring by half: 50–30, 22–33
Pts: Kyriacou 20; Rebs: Zachariou 7 Asts: Stylianides 9		Pts: Selmani 12; Rebs: Mema 7 Asts: Selmani, Kuqo 4

Laugardalshöll, Reykjavík

26 May 1996
16:00

Boxscore

Iceland	87–98	Denmark
Scoring by half: 40–51, 47–47
Pts: Örlygsson 25; Rebs: Birgisson 9 Asts: Hardarson, Örlygsson, Arnarson 3		Pts: Jerichow 23; Rebs: Jerichow 11; Asts: T. Pedersen 4

Laugardalshöll, Reykjavík
Attendance: 1,200
Referees: Bruno Gasperin (FRA), Alexander Fassen (NED)

26 May 1996
18:00

Boxscore

Luxembourg	81–115	Ireland
Scoring by half: 41–66, 40–49
Pts: Feyder 31; Rebs: Boever 6 Asts: Adam 7		Pts: Lacey 20; Rebs: Callahan 11; Asts: Callahan 6

Laugardalshöll, Reykjavík

== Qualifying round ==
Qualified for the Semi-Final Round

=== Group A (Nicosia, Cyprus) ===
Team	Pld	W	L	PF	PA	PD	Pts
Czech Republic	3	3	0	230	154	+76	6
Georgia	3	2	1	210	208	+2	5
Austria	3	1	2	167	192	−25	4
Cyprus	3	0	3	162	222	−60	3

23 May 1997

Boxscore

Cyprus	57–61	Austria
Scoring by half: 18–29, 39–32
Pts: Stylianides 28; Rebs: Soleas 8 Asts: Stylianides, Michail 1		Pts: Ašćerić 16; Rebs: Ašćerić 18; Asts: Fritz 2

Nicosia, Cyprus

23 May 1997

Boxscore

Czech Republic	79–71	Georgia
Scoring by half: 51–29, 28–42
Pts: Vahala 16; Rebs: Trnka 10; Asts: Okáč 3		Pts: Natsvlishvili 24; Rebs: Natsvlishvili 12; Asts: Chkheidze 2

Nicosia, Cyprus

24 May 1997

Boxscore

Cyprus	69–72	Georgia
Scoring by half: 25–38, 44–34
Pts: Stylianides 17; Rebs: Soleas 9 Asts: Stylianides 3		Pts: Natsvlishvili 28; Rebs: Natsvlishvili 10; Asts: Khoshtaria 2

Nicosia, Cyprus

24 May 1997

Boxscore

Austria	46–68	Czech Republic
Scoring by half: 20–32, 26–36
Pts: Ašćerić 12; Rebs: Ašćerić 6 Asts: Lovrek 2		Pts: Okáč 22; Rebs: Okáč, Klapetek 7 Asts: Czudek 4

Nicosia, Cyprus

25 May 1997

Boxscore

Cyprus	37–89	Czech Republic
Scoring by half: 22–44, 15–45
Pts: Zachariou 10; Rebs: Zachariou 6 Asts: Zachariou 1		Pts: Trnka 16; Rebs: Okáč 14; Asts: Okáč 3

Nicosia, Cyprus

25 May 1997

Boxscore

Georgia	67–60 (OT)	Austria
Scoring by half: 34–31, 22–25 Overtime: 11–4
Pts: Natsvlishvili 22; Rebs: Natsvlishvili 15; Asts: Tortladze 4		Pts: Fritz 16; Rebs: Ašćerić, Moschik 7 Asts: Lovrek, Nusterer, Volcic, Ašćerić 2

Nicosia, Cyprus

=== Group B (Dublin, Ireland) ===
Times given below are in Western European Summer Time (UTC+01:00).

Team	Pld	W	L	PF	PA	PD	Pts
Netherlands	3	3	0	239	208	+31	6
Belgium	3	2	1	266	235	+31	5
Ireland	3	1	2	226	225	+1	4
Norway	3	0	3	203	265	−62	3

23 May 1997
18:00

Boxscore

Netherlands	79–63	Norway
Scoring by half: 41–25, 38–38
Pts: Hammink 19; Rebs: Hammink 11; Asts: Hammink 3		Pts: Bryn 14; Rebs: Bryn 9 Asts: Gjerde 5

National Basketball Arena, Dublin, Ireland

23 May 1997
20:00

Boxscore

Ireland	79–82	Belgium
Scoring by half: 50–44, 29–38
Pts: Tomidy 24; Rebs: Tomidy 11; Asts: O'Connell, Callahan 2		Pts: Sappenberghs 15; Rebs: Struelens 9 Asts: Jaumin 4

National Basketball Arena, Dublin, Ireland

24 May 1997
18:00

Boxscore

Belgium	76–82	Netherlands
Scoring by half: 40–43, 36–39
Pts: Struelens 23; Rebs: Struelens 13; Asts: Desaever 1		Pts: Huijbens 25; Rebs: Huijbens 8 Asts: Faijdherbe 3

National Basketball Arena, Dublin, Ireland

24 May 1997
20:00

Boxscore

Ireland	78–65	Norway
Scoring by half: 36–34, 42–31
Pts: Tomidy 22; Rebs: O'Connell 11; Asts: Fulton, Maguire, O'Connell 1		Pts: Bryn 17; Rebs: Sønsteby 7 Asts: Bryn 2

National Basketball Arena, Dublin, Ireland

25 May 1997
15:00

Boxscore

Belgium	108–75	Norway
Scoring by half: 54–33, 54–42
Pts: Stas 25; Rebs: Struelens 16; Asts: Jaumin, Bayer 3		Pts: Bryn 27; Rebs: Sønsteby 10; Asts: Sønsteby 4

National Basketball Arena, Dublin, Ireland

25 May 1997
17:00

Boxscore

Ireland	69–78	Netherlands
Scoring by half: 29–35, 40–43
Pts: Conlan 13; Rebs: Lacey, Tomidy 9 Asts: Conlan, Tomidy 1		Pts: Hammink 23; Rebs: Huijbens 11; Asts: de Waard 4

National Basketball Arena, Dublin, Ireland

=== Group C (Pezinok, Slovakia) ===
Times given below are in Central European Summer Time (UTC+02:00).

Team	Pld	W	L	PF	PA	PD	Pts
Slovakia	3	3	0	229	185	+44	6
England	3	2	1	267	208	+59	5
Switzerland	3	1	2	199	223	−24	4
Luxembourg	3	0	3	187	266	−79	3

23 May 1997
17:00

Boxscore

Luxembourg	64–108	England
Scoring by half: 32–51, 32–57
Pts: Horsmans 21; Rebs: Wohl 8 Asts: Adam, Schroeder, Wolter, Feyder 2		Pts: Whyte 18; Rebs: Huggins 7 Asts: Bucknall 7

Hala Pezinok, Pezinok, Slovakia

23 May 1997
19:00

Boxscore

Slovakia	68–58	Switzerland
Scoring by half: 30–30, 38–28
Pts: Wimmer 19; Rebs: Petruška 12; Asts: Jakabovič 5		Pts: Gojanovic 15; Rebs: Valis 6 Asts: Valis 2

Hala Pezinok, Pezinok, Slovakia

24 May 1997
17:00

Boxscore

England	85–63	Switzerland
Scoring by half: 41–28, 44–35
Pts: Bucknall 25; Rebs: Amaechi 8 Asts: Bucknall 2		Pts: Gojanovic 15; Rebs: Gojanovic 6 Asts: Lamka 3

Hala Pezinok, Pezinok, Slovakia

24 May 1997
19:00

Boxscore

Luxembourg	53–80	Slovakia
Scoring by half: 31–43, 22–37
Pts: Feyder 23; Rebs: Boever 5 Asts: Adam 3		Pts: Jakabovič 16; Rebs: Petruška 8 Asts: Jakabovič 6

Hala Pezinok, Pezinok, Slovakia

25 May 1997
16:00

Boxscore

Switzerland	78–70	Luxembourg
Scoring by half: 38–36, 40–34
Pts: Gojanovic 21; Rebs: Thévenoz 8 Asts: Koller 4		Pts: Feyder 31; Rebs: Horsmans 5 Asts: Adam 2

Hala Pezinok, Pezinok, Slovakia

25 May 1997
18:00

Boxscore

Slovakia	81–74 (OT)	England
Scoring by half: 27–35, 40–32 Overtime: 14–7
Pts: Michail 30; Rebs: Petruška 11; Asts: Petruška 4		Pts: Amaechi 17; Rebs: Amaechi 12; Asts: Baker, Bucknall 2

Hala Pezinok, Pezinok, Slovakia
Attendance: 1,000

=== Group D (Dej, Romania) ===
Times given below are in Eastern European Summer Time (UTC+03:00).

Team	Pld	W	L	PF	PA	PD	Pts
Portugal	3	2	1	293	229	+64	5
Romania	3	2	1	264	217	+47	5
Finland	3	2	1	239	223	+16	5
Wales	3	0	3	192	223	−31	3

23 May 1997
15:30

Boxscore

Portugal	101–75	Finland
Scoring by half: 43–30, 58–45
Pts: Gómez Marques Pinto 30; Rebs: Gómez Marques Pinto 5 Asts: A. Selores Ramos, Rodrigues Neves, Oliveira Marçal 1		Pts: Pehkonen 13; Rebs: Möttölä 2 Asts: Riihelä 1

Arena of Somes S.A., Dej, Romania

23 May 1997
18:00

Boxscore

Romania	113–68	Wales
Scoring by half: 47–21, 66–47
Pts: Popescu 22; Rebs: Popescu 11; Asts: Alexe 4		Pts: Horrocks 22; Rebs: Stone 9 Asts: Hall 4

Arena of Somes S.A., Dej, Romania

24 May 1997
16:00

Boxscore

Wales	64–107	Portugal
Scoring by half: 33–58, 31–49
Pts: Walker 16; Rebs: Robbins 14; Asts: Horrocks 3		Pts: Machado Gomes 17; Rebs: Oliveira Marçal 16; Asts: Dias da Silva 7

Arena of Somes S.A., Dej, Romania

24 May 1997
18:00

Boxscore

Finland	64–62	Romania
Scoring by half: 32–34, 32–28
Pts: Lehtonen 17; Rebs: Luhtanen 9 Asts: Luhtanen 5		Pts: Palii 14; Rebs: Palii 13; Asts: Alecu 4

Arena of Somes S.A., Dej, Romania

25 May 1997
16:00

Boxscore

Finland	100–60	Wales
Scoring by half: 51–25, 49–35
Pts: Möttölä 22; Rebs: Riihelä 13; Asts: Lehtonen 4		Pts: Stone 11; Rebs: Stone 5

Arena of Somes S.A., Dej, Romania

25 May 1997
18:00

Boxscore

Romania	89–85	Portugal
Scoring by half: 50–36, 39–49
Pts: Voinescu 23; Rebs: Ardelean 8 Asts: Stefan, Alexe 1		Pts: Gómez Marques Pinto 25; Rebs: Dias da Silva, Rodrigues Neves 3 Asts: Amorim dos Santos, Rodrigues Neves, Machado Gomes 1

Arena of Somes S.A., Dej, Romania

== Semi-final round ==
Qualified for EuroBasket 1999

=== Group A ===
Team	Pld	W	L	PF	PA	PD	Pts	Tie
Slovenia	10	9	1	810	695	+115	19	
Greece	10	7	3	853	704	+149	17	1–1, +2
Germany	10	7	3	731	688	+43	17	1–1, -2
Bulgaria	10	3	7	744	831	−87	13	
Slovakia	10	2	8	690	792	−102	12	1–1, +5
Belgium	10	2	8	728	775	−47	12	1–1, -5

26 November 1997
18:45

Boxscore

Greece	76–79	Slovenia
Scoring by half: 39–35, 37–44
Pts: Alvertis 21; Rebs: Alvertis 8 Asts: Sigalas, Kalaitzis, Koronios, Oikonomou 2		Pts: Tovornik 32; Rebs: Tušek 10; Asts: Gorenc 3

Athens
Attendance: 5,000
Referees: Fabio Facchini (ITA), Moise Bitton (ISR)

26 November 1997
19:30

Boxscore

Germany	76–73	Bulgaria
Scoring by half: 36–33, 40–40
Pts: Rödl 21; Rebs: Welp 15; Asts: Rödl 4		Pts: Natov, Minchev 19; Rebs: Petrov 9 Asts: Ravutsov 9

Duisburg
Attendance: 1,200
Referees: Ivan Zachara (CZE), Kestutis Pilipauskas (LTU)

26 November 1997
20:00

Boxscore

Belgium	75–68	Slovakia
Scoring by half: 36–34, 39–34
Pts: Desaever 27; Rebs: Struelens 14; Asts: Struelens 5		Pts: Michalík 20; Rebs: Melus 9 Asts: Micuda 1

Arena of BBC Okapi Maes, Aalst
Attendance: 1,500
Referees: Keith Bruce (ENG), Michel Zegwaard (NED)

29 November 1997
17:30

Boxscore

Slovakia	73–76	Greece
Scoring by half: 33–43, 40–33
Pts: Toya 24; Rebs: Andruska 7 Asts: Wimmer, Timko 3		Pts: Alvertis 21; Rebs: Alvertis 11; Asts: Koronios, Sigalas, Alvertis, Oikonomou 1

Košice
Attendance: 1,500
Referees: Konrad Tomczyk (POL), Dubravko Muhvic (CRO)

29 November 1997
17:30

Boxscore

Bulgaria	86–82 (OT)	Belgium
Scoring by half: 37–32, 26–31 Overtime: 23-19
Pts: Minchev 24; Rebs: Natov, Minchev 9 Asts: Ravutsov, Minchev 2		Pts: Ibens 21; Rebs: Struelens 9 Asts: Desaever 3

Stara Zagora
Attendance: 1,500
Referees: Murat Biricik (TUR), Mikhail Davydov (RUS)

29 November 1997
18:00

Boxscore

Slovenia	75–71	Germany
Scoring by half: 35–38, 40–33
Pts: Tušek 23; Rebs: Tušek 10; Asts: Daneu, Alibegović, Tušek, Jagodnik, Gorenc 1		Pts: Harnisch 16; Rebs: Harnisch, Rödl, Welp 5 Asts: Nürnberger, Rödl, Wucherer, Nees 1

Polzela
Attendance: 2,200
Referees: Alberto Grossi (ITA), Romualdas Brazauskas (LTU)

3 Dec 1997
18:00

Boxscore

Slovakia	70–101	Slovenia
Scoring by half: 35–51, 35–50
Pts: Andruska 24; Rebs: Andruska, Timko 6 Asts: Micuda 4		Pts: Tovornik 28; Rebs: Tušek 11; Asts: Gorenc 3

Košice
Attendance: 1,600
Referees: Mauro Pozzana (ITA), Jozsef Harsanyi (HUN)

3 Dec 1997
18:45

Boxscore

Greece	92–62	Bulgaria
Scoring by half: 45–24, 47–38
Pts: Alvertis 23; Rebs: Rentzias 10; Asts: Chatzis 4		Pts: Stoyanov 13; Rebs: Natov 7 Asts: Natov 4

Lamia
Attendance: 3,500
Referees: Tihomir Bubalo (SRB), Andrei Bostan (MDA)

3 Dec 1997
20:00

Boxscore

Belgium	70–72	Germany
Scoring by half: 37–29, 33–43
Pts: Struelens 21; Rebs: Struelens 12; Asts: Desaever 4		Pts: Harnisch 19; Rebs: Rödl 6 Asts: Rödl 3

Arena of BBC Okapi Maes, Aalst
Attendance: 1,800
Referees: Eduardo Sancha (ESP), Pascal Dorizon (FRA)

25 February 1998
17:00

Boxscore

Bulgaria	86–70	Slovakia
Scoring by half: 39–30, 47–40
Pts: Stoykov 21; Rebs: Natov 14; Asts: Ravutsov 6		Pts: Micuda 18; Rebs: Micuda 6 Asts: Toya 3

Burgas
Attendance: 1,000
Referees: Goran Urukalo (CRO), Milivoje Jovcic (SRB)

25 February 1998
19:30

Boxscore

Germany	74–71	Greece
Scoring by half: 29–37, 45–34
Pts: Koch, Nees 12; Rebs: Rödl 8 Asts: Rödl, Koch 6		Pts: Oikonomou, Koronios 14; Rebs: Oikonomou 5 Asts: Koronios 6

Hanns-Martin-Schleyer-Halle, Stuttgart
Attendance: 8,900
Referees: Miguel Betancor (ESP), Pierre-Yves Bichon (FRA)

25 February 1998
20:00

Boxscore

Slovenia	72–61	Belgium
Scoring by half: 39–27, 33–34
Pts: Tovornik 20; Rebs: Jurković 11; Asts: Gorenc 4		Pts: Cleymans, Desy 14; Rebs: Cleymans 14; Asts: Desaever 6

Kranj
Attendance: 1,600
Referees: Tiziano Zancanella (ITA), Gábor Missura (HUN)

28 February 1998
16:00

Boxscore

Slovakia	66–68	Germany
Scoring by half: 42–38, 24–30
Pts: Petruška 22; Rebs: Petruška 10; Asts: Wimmer 3		Pts: Rödl 25; Rebs: Gnad, Nees 4 Asts: Terdenge 4

Ruzomberok
Attendance: 1,800
Referees: Peter Poiger (AUT), Almir Aksamija (BIH)

28 February 1998
17:30

Boxscore

Bulgaria	79–71	Slovenia
Scoring by half: 34–41, 45–30
Pts: Stoykov 30; Rebs: Natov 8 Asts: Natov, Stoykov 4		Pts: Tušek 14; Rebs: Tovornik 9 Asts: Kraljević, Horvat, Daneu, Tovornik, Duščak 1

Burgas
Attendance: 1,000
Referees: Recep Ankarali (TUR), Volodymyr Drabikovskyi (UKR)

28 February 1998
21:00

Boxscore

Greece	77–56	Belgium
Scoring by half: 50–25, 27–31
Pts: Oikonomou 14; Rebs: Sigalas 8 Asts: Oikonomou 6		Pts: Cleymans 15; Rebs: Cleymans 6 Asts: Cleymans 2

Drama
Attendance: 3,200
Referees: Andrej Jelen (SLO), Reuven Virovnik (ISR)

25 November 1998
17:30

Boxscore

Slovenia	79–66	Greece
Scoring by half: 35–32, 44–34
Pts: Nesterović 20; Rebs: Tušek, Jurković 5 Asts: Daneu 3		Pts: Alvertis 18; Rebs: Alvertis, Tsakalidis, Rentzias 3 Asts: Bountouris, Sigalas, Oikonomou 1

Maribor
Attendance: 5,000
Referees: Juan Mitjana (ESP), Pierluigi D'Este (ITA)

25 November 1998
17:30

Boxscore

Bulgaria	61–83	Germany
Scoring by half: 28–39, 33–44
Pts: Stoykov 24; Rebs: Natov 10; Asts: Natov, Ravutsov 4		Pts: Nowitzki 21; Rebs: Nowitzki 5 Asts: Nürnberger4

Burgas
Attendance: 1,500
Referees: Branko Jovanovic (SRB), Fabio Facchini (ITA)

25 November 1998
17:30

Boxscore

Slovakia	88–76	Belgium
Scoring by half: 41–33, 47–43
Pts: Petruška 29; Rebs: Petruška 14; Asts: Lovik 4		Pts: Struelens 16; Rebs: Goethals 8 Asts: Jaumin 6

Handlova
Attendance: 1,200
Referees: Danko Radic (CRO), Leszek Rakoczy (POL)

28 November 1998
14:00

Boxscore

Germany	76–91	Slovenia
Scoring by half: 35–44, 41–47
Pts: Rödl, Femerling 13; Rebs: Musch 6 Asts: Machowski 3		Pts: Daneu, Jurković 19; Rebs: Nesterović, Jurković 6 Asts: Duščak 3

Hardtberghalle, Bonn
Attendance: 1,200
Referees: Jan Herweijer (NED), Romualdas Brazauskas (LTU)

28 November 1998
18:15

Boxscore

Greece	79–72	Slovakia
Scoring by half: 37–21, 42–51
Pts: Papanikolaou 23; Rebs: Sigalas 5 Asts: Oikonomou 4		Pts: Lovik 28; Rebs: Petruška 9 Asts: Michalík 3

Chalkida
Attendance: 2,500
Referees: Stelian Banica (ROU), Volodymyr Drabikovskyi (UKR)

29 November 1998
15:30

Boxscore

Belgium	93–75	Bulgaria
Scoring by half: 48–36, 45–39
Pts: Struelens 27; Rebs: Struelens 14; Asts: Struelens, Cleymans 5		Pts: Koeshinov 22; Rebs: Balev 9 Asts: Ravutsov, Veltchev 1

Spiroudome, Charleroi
Attendance: 3,000
Referees: Jan Herweijer (NED), Romualdas Brazauskas (LTU)

2 Dec 1998
19:00

Boxscore

Bulgaria	83–105	Greece
Scoring by half: 43–56, 40–49
Pts: Stoykov 18; Rebs: Balev 7 Asts: Dimitrov, Minchev, Ravutsov, Balev, Stoykov 2		Pts: Alvertis 25; Rebs: Papanikolaou 8 Asts: Alvertis 4

Burgas
Attendance: 1,000
Referees: Karel Bruna (CZE), Gennaro Colucci (ITA)

2 Dec 1998
19:30

Boxscore

Germany	79–70	Belgium
Scoring by half: 37–37, 42–33
Pts: Nowitzki 18; Rebs: Femerling 8 Asts: Rödl 5		Pts: Goethals 15; Rebs: Struelens 5 Asts: Jaumin 5

Hardtberghalle, Bonn
Attendance: 3,100
Referees: Fernand Hengel (LUX), Pascal Dorizon (FRA)

2 Dec 1998
20:00

Boxscore

Slovenia	80–57	Slovakia
Scoring by half: 45–31, 35–26
Pts: Zdovc 14; Rebs: Tušek 6 Asts: Zdovc, Nesterović 3		Pts: Michalík, Micuda 18; Rebs: Michalík 9 Asts: Michalík, Micuda 2

Murska Sobota Sports Hall, Murska Sobota
Attendance: 1,600
Referees: György Varadi (HUN), Andreas Roth (AUT)

24 February 1999
17:30

Boxscore

Slovakia	73–72	Bulgaria
Scoring by half: 41–29, 32–43
Pts: Jakabovic 17; Rebs: Micuda 6 Asts: Toya 3		Pts: Droumev 21; Rebs: Natov 12; Asts: Petrov, Veltchev 3

Handlova
Attendance: 1,000
Referees: Virginijus Dovidavicius (LTU), Grzegorz Ziemblicki (POL)

24 February 1999
20:00

Boxscore

Belgium	72–76	Slovenia
Scoring by half: 39–39, 33–37
Pts: Struelens 16; Rebs: Struelens 14; Asts: Stas 6		Pts: Smodiš 21; Rebs: Jagodnik 9 Asts: Trifunović, Jagodnik, Jeklin 2

Charleroi
Attendance: 1,800
Referees: Antonio Coelho (POR), Gennaro Colucci (ITA)

24 February 1999
21:00

Boxscore

Greece	58–53	Germany
Scoring by half: 29–26, 29–27
Pts: Papanikolaou 14; Rebs: Papanikolaou 10; Asts: Alvertis, Bountouris, Papanikolaou, Sigalas 2		Pts: Rödl 19; Rebs: Femerling 11; Asts: Pešić 3

Drama
Attendance: 3,200
Referees: Romualdas Brazauskas (LTU), Ivan Zachara (CZE)

27 February 1999
14:00

Boxscore

Germany	79–53	Slovakia
Scoring by half: 37–24, 42–29
Pts: Femerling 16; Rebs: Nees 7 Asts: Rödl 4		Pts: Micuda, Toya 13; Rebs: Micuda 11; Asts: Wimmer, Toya 2

ZAB Halle, Dessau
Attendance: 3,000
Referees: Marek Nowicki (POL), Aliaksandr Yarotski (BLR)

27 February 1999
17:15

Boxscore

Belgium	73–82	Greece
Scoring by half: 35–39, 38–43
Pts: Cleymans 18; Rebs: Struelens 7 Asts: Stas 6		Pts: Alvertis 24; Rebs: Papanikolaou 8 Asts: Alvertis, Nikolaidis 2

Brussels
Attendance: 2,100
Referees: Pascal Dorizon (FRA), Mika Moberg (FIN)

27 February 1999
20:00

Boxscore

Slovenia	86–67	Bulgaria
Scoring by half: 41–38, 45–29
Pts: Smodiš 26; Rebs: Smodiš 9 Asts: Tovornik, Trifunović 4		Pts: Stoykov 28; Rebs: Stoykov 5 Asts: Veltchev 2

Sežana
Attendance: 2,000
Referees: Ivo Dolinek (CZE), Stelian Banica (ROU)

=== Group B ===
Team	Pld	W	L	PF	PA	PD	Pts
Russia	10	9	1	942	723	+219	19
Macedonia	10	8	2	747	677	+70	18
Hungary	10	6	4	693	664	+29	16
Poland	10	4	6	758	768	−10	14
Portugal	10	3	7	709	813	−104	13
Romania	10	0	10	615	846	−231	10

26 November 1997
17:00

Boxscore

Russia	116–73	Macedonia
Scoring by half: 56–36, 60–37
Pts: Morgunov 20; Rebs: Morgunov 10; Asts: Karasev, Pashutin 7		Pts: Jovanovski 25; Rebs: Stankovik 7 Asts: Stefanov 6

Moscow
Attendance: 2,000
Referees: Jaroslav Janac (SVK), Juris Kokainis (LAT)

26 November 1997
17:30

Boxscore

Poland	60–69	Hungary
Scoring by half: 30–26, 30–43
Pts: Bacik, Tomczyk 11; Rebs: Dryja 10; Asts: Tomczyk 3		Pts: Boros 18; Rebs: Gulyas 7 Asts: Boros 7

Tarnów
Attendance: 3,500
Referees: Peter Klingbiel (GER), Pavel Volejnik (CZE)

26 November 1997
18:00

Boxscore

Romania	70–71	Portugal
Scoring by half: 34–39, 36–32
Pts: Palii 18; Rebs: Stefan 10; Asts: Alexe, Voinescu 3		Pts: Gómez Marques Pinto 19; Rebs: Gómez Marques Pinto 12; Asts: Rodrigues Neves 5

Bucharest
Attendance: 1,000
Referees: Memduh Öget (TUR), Milivoje Jovcic (SRB)

29 November 1997
14:35

Boxscore

Portugal	76–91	Russia
Scoring by half: 40–47, 36–44
Pts: Oliveira Marçal 31; Rebs: Gómez Marques Pinto 8 Asts: Rodrigues Neves, Oliveira Marçal 2		Pts: Karasev 22; Rebs: Panov 10; Asts: Karasev 4

Povoa do Varzim
Attendance: 1,200
Referees: Michael Howell (ENG), Vicente Sanchis (ESP)

29 November 1997
17:15

Boxscore

Hungary	86–56	Romania
Scoring by half: 41–30, 45–26
Pts: Gulyas 16; Rebs: Czigler 6 Asts: Mészáros 5		Pts: Alexe, Stanescu 15; Rebs: Alexe 6 Asts: Alexe 3

Arena of Albacomp-UPC, Székesfehérvar
Attendance: 1,000
Referees: Andrej Lovsin (SLO), Miodrag Licina (SRB)

29 November 1997
20:30

Boxscore

Macedonia	79–72	Poland
Scoring by half: 37–30, 42–42
Pts: Naumoski 49; Rebs: Naumoski, Blazevski 4 Asts: Naumoski 4		Pts: Zielinski 25; Rebs: Szybilski, Jankowski, Bacik 4 Asts: Zielinski 6

Skopje
Attendance: 2,500
Referees: Ladislav Janac (SVK), Recep Ankarali (TUR)

3 Dec 1997
17:00

Boxscore

Russia	87–78	Hungary
Scoring by half: 52–41, 35–37
Pts: Karasev 30; Rebs: Mikhailov 15; Asts: Karasev 7		Pts: Gulyas 23; Rebs: Gulyas 10; Asts: Mészáros, Boros 6

Moscow
Attendance: 2,300
Referees: Zdenek Sedivy (CZE), Virginijus Dovidavicius (LTU)

3 Dec 1997
18:00

Boxscore

Romania	70–81	Poland
Scoring by half: 34–44, 36–37
Pts: Stefan 17; Rebs: Alexe, Carutasu 6 Asts: Alexe 7		Pts: Tomczyk 23; Rebs: Szybilski 10; Asts: Bacik 5

Bucharest
Attendance: 1,000
Referees: Stavros Tsanidis (GRE), Stojan Fiser (SLO)

3 Dec 1997
19:30

Boxscore

Portugal	64–87	Macedonia
Scoring by half: 27–41, 37–46
Pts: Gómez Marques Pinto 23; Rebs: Gómez Marques Pinto 7 Asts: Rodrigues Neves 4		Pts: Naumoski 32; Rebs: Gečevski 7 Asts: Bocevski 3

Mafra
Attendance: 1,000
Referees: Bruno Vauthier (FRA), Luigi Lamonica (ITA)

25 February 1998
17:50

Boxscore

Poland	75–82	Russia
Scoring by half: 44–45, 31–37
Pts: Tomczyk 16; Rebs: Szybilski 10; Asts: Zielinski 3		Pts: Karasev 20; Rebs: Nosov 8 Asts: Panov, Babkov 2

Wrocław
Attendance: 4,000
Referees: Ivan Zachara (CZE), Ladislav Janac (SVK)

25 February 1998
18:00

Boxscore

Hungary	85–69	Portugal
Scoring by half: 51–42, 34–27
Pts: Gulyas 18; Rebs: Gulyas 7 Asts: Bencze, Halm 5		Pts: Gómez Marques Pinto 22; Rebs: Dias da Silva, Gómez Marques Pinto 7 Asts: Rodrigues Neves 6

Pécs
Attendance: 3,500
Referees: Tomislav Jovancic (SRB), Karel Bruna (CZE)

25 February 1998
20:30

Boxscore

Macedonia	80–52	Romania
Scoring by half: 39–18, 41–34
Pts: Naumoski 23; Rebs: Bocevski, Blazevski 6 Asts: Blazevski 5		Pts: Stanescu 20; Rebs: Stanescu 10; Asts: Constantinescu 2

Skopje
Attendance: 3,500
Referees: Kamen Toshev (BUL), Zdenek Sedivy (CZE)

28 February 1998
16:30

Boxscore

Portugal	81–86	Poland
Scoring by half: 48–55, 33–31
Pts: A. Selores Ramos 17; Rebs: Rodrigues Neves 5 Asts: Rodrigues Neves 5		Pts: Zielinski 24; Rebs: Szybilski, Tomczyk 6 Asts: Kosciuk 4

Mafra
Attendance: 2,500
Referees: Juan Redondo (ESP), Alan Richardson (ENG)

28 February 1998
17:00

Boxscore

Hungary	49–68	Macedonia
Scoring by half: 26–38, 23–30
Pts: Sitku 13; Rebs: Czigler 6 Asts: Bencze 4		Pts: Naumoski 23; Rebs: Mihajlovski, Bocevski 5 Asts: Mihajlovski, Gechevski 4

Pécs
Attendance: 3,500
Referees: Peter Klingbiel (GER), Andreas Roth (AUT)

28 February 1998
18:00

Boxscore

Russia	115–45	Romania
Scoring by half: 52–30, 63–15
Pts: Babkov 33; Rebs: Kurashov 15; Asts: Pashutin 20		Pts: Palii 12; Rebs: Mircea 9 Asts: Palii, Păun 3

Moscow
Attendance: 1,200
Referees: Roman Ryzhyk (UKR), Andrei Bostan (MDA)

24 November 1998
19:30

Boxscore

Portugal	81–64	Romania
Scoring by half: 43–32, 38–32
Pts: Gómez Marques Pinto 16; Rebs: Dias da Silva, Gómez Marques Pinto 9 Asts: Tavares, A. Selores Ramos, Azevedo de Seixas 2		Pts: Tenter, Lapuste 20; Rebs: Lapuste 6 Asts: Tenter 3

Tondela
Attendance: 3,500
Referees: Andrew Thackray (NZL), Victor Mas (ESP)

25 November 1998
18:00

Boxscore

Hungary	78–68 (OT)	Poland
Scoring by half: 32–35, 33–30 Overtime: 13-3
Pts: Gulyas 24; Rebs: Sitku 7 Asts: Boros 5		Pts: Dryja 12; Rebs: Jankowski 5 Asts: Wojcik 3

Paks
Attendance: 1,500
Referees: Ladislav Janac (SVK), Milivoje Jovcic (SRB)

25 November 1998
20:00

Boxscore

Macedonia	89–94	Russia
Scoring by half: 34–50, 55–44
Pts: Naumoski 36; Rebs: Stankovik 7 Asts: Stefanov 5		Pts: Karasev 24; Rebs: Nosov 13; Asts: Panov 5

Skopje
Attendance: 1,200
Referees: Memduh Öget (TUR), Ivan Zachara (CZE)

28 November 1998
16:25

Boxscore

Poland	50–61	Macedonia
Scoring by half: 28–32, 22–29
Pts: Zielinski 12; Rebs: Zielinski 11; Asts: Suski 5		Pts: Naumoski 29; Rebs: Stankovik 7 Asts: Blazevski, Stefanov 2

Pruszkow
Attendance: 2,000
Referees: Efim Resser (GER), Lars Klaar (SWE)

28 November 1998
17:00

Boxscore

Russia	108–60	Portugal
Scoring by half: 54–25, 54–35
Pts: Petrenko 18; Rebs: Petrenko 14; Asts: Pashutin 8		Pts: Gouveia Simão 11; Rebs: Gómez Marques Pinto 4 Asts: Oliveira Marçal 4

Moscow
Attendance: 4,000
Referees: Kestutis Pilipauskas (LTU), Borys Shulga (UKR)

28 November 1998
18:00

Boxscore

Romania	54–72	Hungary
Scoring by half: 24–37, 30–35
Pts: Bicov 14; Rebs: Apostol, Lapuste 5 Asts: Tenter 5		Pts: Sitku 22; Rebs: Gulyas 6 Asts: Kálmán, Boros 4

Sibiu
Attendance: 2,500
Referees: Tihomir Bubalo (SRB), Tonci Anzulovic (CRO)

2 Dec 1998
17:20

Boxscore

Poland	91–64	Romania
Scoring by half: 44–30, 47–34
Pts: Jankowski 30; Rebs: Jankowski 11; Asts: Zielinski 7		Pts: Lapuste 22; Rebs: Lapuste 10; Asts: Apostol 4

Tarnów
Attendance: 2,500
Referees: Juris Kokainis (LAT), Miroslav Macela (CZE)

2 Dec 1998
18:00

Boxscore

Hungary	60–59	Russia
Scoring by half: 32–25, 28–34
Pts: Dávid 24; Rebs: Dávid 9 Asts: Halm 5		Pts: Mikhailov 11; Rebs: Goutorov 6 Asts: Domani, Petrenko 2

Salgotarjan
Attendance: 1,200
Referees: Nikolaos Zavlanos (GRE), Sasa Pukl (SLO)

2 Dec 1998
20:00

Boxscore

Macedonia	75–63	Portugal
Scoring by half: 42–26, 33–37
Pts: Naumoski 20; Rebs: Bocevski 6 Asts: Naumoski 5		Pts: Oliveira Marçal 11; Rebs: Bento dos Reis Pires, Dias da Silva, Oliveira Marçal 4 Asts: Bento dos Reis Pires, Azevedo de Seixas 3

Skopje
Attendance: 1,200
Referees: Vladimir Atanasov (BUL), Tiziano Zancanella (ITA)

24 February 1999
18:00

Boxscore

Romania	59–71	Macedonia
Scoring by half: 34–29, 25–42
Pts: Torday 18; Rebs: Torday, Alecu 9 Asts: Alecu, Bicov, Fometescu, Popa 1		Pts: Stefanov 25; Rebs: Stankovik 8 Asts: Stefanov, Ilievski 2

Iași
Attendance: 2,500
Referees: Ladislav Janac (SVK), Recep Ankarali (TUR)

24 February 1999
19:00

Boxscore

Russia	92–86	Poland
Scoring by half: 48–40, 44–46
Pts: Z. Pashutin 27; Rebs: E. Pashutin, Yudin, Sevastianov 3 Asts: E. Pashutin 6		Pts: Zielinski 17; Rebs: Tomczyk 7 Asts: Tomczyk 4

Tula
Referees: Tihomir Bubalo (SRB), Pavel Volejnik (CZE)

24 February 1999
19:30

Boxscore

Portugal	79–58	Hungary
Scoring by half: 39–23, 40–35
Pts: Gómez Marques Pinto 14; Rebs: Oliveira Marçal 9 Asts: Machado Gomes 4		Pts: Sitku 17; Rebs: Sitku 8 Asts: Mészáros, Sitku 2

Santo André
Attendance: 2,500
Referees: Juan Mitjana (ESP), Serge De Coster (BEL)

27 February 1999
17:30

Boxscore

Macedonia	64–58	Hungary
Scoring by half: 43–29, 21–29
Pts: Naumoski 32; Rebs: Bocevski 8 Asts: Naumoski, Bocevski 2		Pts: Sitku 15; Rebs: Mészáros 5 Asts: Halm 4

Kumanovo
Attendance: 5,500
Referees: Efim Resser (GER), Haluk Yesiloglu (TUR)

27 February 1999
17:30

Boxscore

Poland	89–65	Portugal
Scoring by half: 47–31, 42–34
Pts: Zielinski 18; Rebs: Jankowski, Tomczyk 7 Asts: Zielinski, Kosciuk 3		Pts: A. Selores Ramos 14; Rebs: De Sousa Moreira N.S. 6 Asts: Machado Gomes, Costa, A. Selores Ramos 2

Pruszkow
Attendance: 2,500
Referees: Mats Bjarnemar (SWE), Volodymyr Drabikovskyi (UKR)

27 February 1999
18:00

Boxscore

Romania	81–98	Russia
Scoring by half: 43–53, 38–45
Pts: Torday 23; Rebs: Alecu, Lapuste 5 Asts: Lapuste 4		Pts: Petrenko 25; Rebs: Pashutin 12; Asts: Pashutin 9

Iași
Attendance: 2,000
Referees: Srdan Dozai (CRO), Sasa Pukl (SLO)

=== Group C ===
Team	Pld	W	L	PF	PA	PD	Pts
Spain	10	10	0	827	643	+184	20
Israel	10	7	3	749	688	+61	17
Ukraine	10	5	5	733	692	+41	15
England	10	4	6	679	726	−47	14
Belarus	10	3	7	652	774	−122	13
Denmark	10	1	9	639	771	−132	11

26 November 1997
19:00

Boxscore

Ukraine	66–83	Spain
Scoring by half: 38–36, 28–47
Pts: Iailo 19; Rebs: Iailo 9 Asts: Zhuravlov, Pudzyrey 3		Pts: Paraiso Gonzalez 22; Rebs: Paraiso Gonzalez 10; Asts: Azofra de la Cuesta 4

Arena of BC Kyiv, Kyiv
Attendance: 5,000
Referees: Grzegorz Ziemblicki (POL), Viliam Koller (SVK)

26 November 1997
19:00

Boxscore

Denmark	64–72	England
Scoring by half: 36–35, 28–37
Pts: Jerichow 23; Rebs: Andersen 8 Asts: Hansen 9		Pts: Amaechi 15; Rebs: Amaechi 6 Asts: Baker 4

K.B. Hallen, Frederiksberg
Attendance: 1,500
Referees: Ryszard Jablonski (POL), Lars Klaar (SWE)

26 November 1997
20:45

Boxscore

Israel	95–64	Belarus
Scoring by half: 51–27, 44–37
Pts: Katz 15; Rebs: Steinhauer 5 Asts: Sheffer 8		Pts: Pyntsikau 20; Rebs: Pyntsikau 4 Asts: Buzliakou 6

Sport Palace, Tel Aviv
Attendance: 9,000
Referees: Fatih Dalay (TUR), Konstantinos Mouzakis (GRE)

29 November 1997
18:00

Boxscore

Ukraine	62–65	Israel
Scoring by half: 33–33, 29–32
Pts: Okunskyy, Kholopov 12; Rebs: Okunskyy, Molchanov, Iailo, Bazelevskyy 4 Asts: Bazelevskyy, Iailo 2		Pts: Henefeld 15; Rebs: Henefeld 6 Asts: Kattache, Goodes, Shelef, Shteinhaur 3

Arena of BC Kyiv, Kyiv
Attendance: 3,000
Referees: Karel Bruna (CZE), Nikolaos Zavlanos (GRE)

29 November 1997
18:00

Boxscore

Belarus	66–60	Denmark
Scoring by half: 24–26, 42–34
Pts: Baidakou 21; Rebs: Jeloudok 8 Asts: Buzliakou 5		Pts: Jerichow 16; Rebs: Larsen 15; Asts: Hauge 3

Minsk
Attendance: 3,000
Referees: Marek Cmikiewicz (POL), Zsolt Hartyani (HUN)

29 November 1997
19:30

Boxscore

England	76–92	Spain
Scoring by half: 38–51, 38–41
Pts: Bucknall 23; Rebs: Amaechi, Huggins 8 Asts: Amoo-Gottfried 3		Pts: Herreros Ros 21; Rebs: Reyes Cabanas 7 Asts: Rodriguez Marín 9

Plymouth Pavilions, Plymouth
Attendance: 1,300
Referees: Kristinn Albertsson (ISL), Efim Resser (GER)

3 Dec 1997
19:00

Boxscore

Denmark	76–95	Israel
Scoring by half: 36–48, 40–47
Pts: Hjorth, H. Pedersen 19; Rebs: Bjerregaard 8 Asts: Hansen 9		Pts: Sheffer, Shteinhaur 16; Rebs: Steinhauer 6 Asts: Goodes 11

K.B. Hallen, Frederiksberg
Attendance: 1,800
Referees: Alexander Faassen (NED), Ainars Poga (LAT)

3 Dec 1997
20:00

Boxscore

England	61–88	Ukraine
Scoring by half: 24–40, 37–48
Pts: Amaechi 17; Rebs: Amaechi 8 Asts: Baker 4		Pts: Okunskyy 18; Rebs: Okunskyy 14; Asts: Prikhodko 6

Spectrum Arena, Guildford
Attendance: 1,500
Referees: Jan Herweijer (NED), Armand De Keyser (BEL)

3 Dec 1997
20:30

Boxscore

Spain	101–53	Belarus
Scoring by half: 52–22, 49–31
Pts: Reyes Cabanas, Paraiso Gonzalez 19; Rebs: Reyes Cabanas 9 Asts: Paraiso Gonzalez, Rodilla Gil 4		Pts: Pyntsikau, Bykau 14; Rebs: Baidakou 5 Asts: Baidakou 2

Alcoy
Attendance: 1,400
Referees: Christophe Vauthier (FRA), Carlos Araujo (POR)

25 February 1998
19:00

Boxscore

Ukraine	66–67	Denmark
Scoring by half: 42–32, 24–35
Pts: Bazelevskyy 15; Rebs: Molchanov, Iailo 4 Asts: Okunskyy 4		Pts: Larsen 18; Rebs: Larsen 8 Asts: Hansen 4

Arena of BC Kyiv, Kyiv
Attendance: 2,300
Referees: Georgiy Valtchev (BUL), Nikolaos Agadakos (GRE)

25 February 1998
19:00

Boxscore

Belarus	55–60	England
Scoring by half: 25–29, 30–31
Pts: Jeloudok, Klemez 10; Rebs: Baidakou 9 Asts: Jeloudok 4		Pts: Bucknall 19; Rebs: Amaechi 12; Asts: Cheung 2

Minsk
Attendance: 3,000
Referees: Plamen Simeonov (BUL), Grzegorz Ziemblicki (POL)

25 February 1998
20:55

Boxscore

Israel	61–67	Spain
Scoring by half: 29–33, 32–34
Pts: Steinhauer 13; Rebs: Steinhauer 6 Asts: Henefeld 6		Pts: Angulo Espinosa 15; Rebs: De Miguel 7 Asts: Herreros Ros, Rodriguez Marín 3

Sport Palace, Tel Aviv
Attendance: 10,000
Referees: Danko Radic (CRO), Nikolaos Zavlanos (GRE)

28 February 1998
13:00

Boxscore

Spain	86–57	Denmark
Scoring by half: 45–26, 41–31
Pts: Angulo Espinosa 15; Rebs: Reyes Cabanas 8 Asts: Rodilla Gil 3		Pts: Jerichow 14; Rebs: Andersen 9 Asts: Hjorth 3

Torrelavega
Attendance: 5,200
Referees: Eric De Neve (BEL), Fernando Rocha (POR)

28 February 1998
18:00

Boxscore

Belarus	72–102	Ukraine
Scoring by half: 30–52, 42–50
Pts: Baidakou 24; Rebs: Jeloudok, Bykau 7 Asts: Kuzmin 7		Pts: Okunskyy 23; Rebs: Okunskyy 12; Asts: Ievstratenko 4

Minsk
Attendance: 3,000
Referees: Sergey Bulanov (RUS), Yuri Yakovlev (MDA)

28 February 1998
20:00

Boxscore

England	68–82	Israel
Scoring by half: 36–37, 32–45
Pts: Amaechi 18; Rebs: Bucknall 8 Asts: Bucknall, Baker 4		Pts: Katz 25; Rebs: Steinhauer 8 Asts: Sheffer, Henefeld, Kattache 2

Arena of Exide Manchester, Manchester
Attendance: 6,000
Referees: Romualdas Brazauskas (LTU), Michel Zegwaard (NED)

25 November 1998
18:00

Boxscore

Belarus	71–65	Israel
Scoring by half: 36–41, 35–24
Pts: Meshcharakou 23; Rebs: Baidakou 8 Asts: Meshcharakou 2		Pts: Steinhauer 23; Rebs: Sheffer, Shteinhaur 9 Asts: Henefeld, Turgeman 3

Minsk
Attendance: 5,000
Referees: Petr Sudek (SVK), Georgiy Valtchev (BUL)

25 November 1998
19:30

Boxscore

Spain	80–51	Ukraine
Scoring by half: 32–34, 48–17
Pts: Reyes Cabanas 20; Rebs: De La Fuente 7 Asts: Corrales Gordo 5		Pts: Volkov, Bazelevskyy 14; Rebs: Volkov 8 Asts: Murzin 2

Leon
Attendance: 3,000
Referees: Antonio Pimentel (POR), Michel Zegwaard (NED)

25 November 1998
19:30

Boxscore

England	87–70	Denmark
Scoring by half: 39–36, 48–34
Pts: Amaechi 21; Rebs: Huggins 7 Asts: Bucknall 6		Pts: Andersen 17; Rebs: Andersen 11; Asts: Jerichow 6

NIA Birmingham, Birmingham
Attendance: 1,200
Referees: Bruno Gasperin (FRA), Leifur Gardarsson (ISL)

28 November 1998
14:35

Boxscore

Denmark	58–69	Belarus
Scoring by half: 25–40, 33–29
Pts: Larsen 14; Rebs: Andersen 12; Asts: Hjorth, Jensen, Andersen 3		Pts: Koul 18; Rebs: Koul 9 Asts: Charko 4

K.B. Hallen, Frederiksberg
Attendance: 1,000
Referees: Goran Radonjic (FRA), Boris Schmidt (GER)

28 November 1998
18:15

Boxscore

Spain	74–58	England
Scoring by half: 45–19, 29–39
Pts: Herreros Ros 20; Rebs: Reyes Cabanas 10; Asts: López Torras, Dueñas Hernandez 2		Pts: Amaechi 21; Rebs: Amaechi 10; Asts: Bucknall, Haslam 1

Leon
Attendance: 5,000
Referees: Serge De Coster (BEL), Bruno Vauthier (FRA)

28 November 1998
21:00

Boxscore

Israel	77–70	Ukraine
Scoring by half: 44–25, 33–45
Pts: Goodes 21; Rebs: Sheffer 7 Asts: Sheffer 7		Pts: Lokhmanchuk 21; Rebs: Lokhmanchuk 9 Asts: Ievstratenko 5

Sport Palace, Tel Aviv
Attendance: 7,000
Referees: Fatih Dalay (TUR), Dubravko Muhvic (CRO)

2 Dec 1998
19:00

Boxscore

Ukraine	66–60	England
Scoring by half: 36–25, 30–35
Pts: Murzin 15; Rebs: Lokhmanchuk 10; Asts: Volkov, Bazelevskyy 3		Pts: Amaechi 15; Rebs: Huggins 9 Asts: Hansell 2

Arena of BC Kyiv, Kyiv
Attendance: 2,700
Referees: Jaroslav Janac (SVK), Goran Urukalo (CRO)

2 Dec 1998
19:00

Boxscore

Belarus	79–93	Spain
Scoring by half: 43–50, 36–43
Pts: Krivonos 16; Rebs: Koul, Kuzmin 4 Asts: Krivonos, Svetnik 1		Pts: Corrales Gordo 19; Rebs: Reyes Cabanas 8 Asts: Angulo Espinosa, Corrales Gordo 4

Minsk
Attendance: 5,000
Referees: Leszek Rakoczy (POL), Ivan Zachara (CZE)

2 Dec 1998
20:50

Boxscore

Israel	67–63	Denmark
Scoring by half: 35–31, 32–32
Pts: Sheffer 19; Rebs: Steinhauer 7 Asts: Shelef 5		Pts: Larsen 24; Rebs: Andersen 9 Asts: Jensen 6

Sport Palace, Tel Aviv
Attendance: 7,500
Referees: Stylianos Koukoulekidis (GRE), Christakis Papadamou (CYP)

24 February 1999
19:00

Boxscore

Denmark	61–83	Ukraine
Scoring by half: 33–46, 28–37
Pts: Larsen 19; Rebs: Larsen 7 Asts: Jensen 5		Pts: Lokhmanchuk 24; Rebs: Lokhmanchuk 6 Asts: Kharchenko, Iailo 3

KB Hallen, Frederiksberg
Referees: Hermann Latz (GER), Marek Cmikiewicz (POL)

24 February 1999
19:30

Boxscore

England	61–56	Belarus
Scoring by half: 31–31, 30–25
Pts: Huggins 18; Rebs: Amaechi 9 Asts: Bucknall, Hansell 3		Pts: Krivonos, Baidakou, Jeloudok 11; Rebs: Koul 10; Asts: Baidakou 3

Arena of Crystal Palace, London
Referees: José Araujo (POR), Goran Radonjic (FRA)

24 February 1999
20:30

Boxscore

Spain	71–63	Israel
Scoring by half: 36–28, 35–35
Pts: Dueñas Hernandez 16; Rebs: Rodriguez Marín 10; Asts: Rodriguez Marín 4		Pts: Steinhauer 18; Rebs: Goodes 5 Asts: Katz, Tapiro 3

Torrejon de Ardoz
Attendance: 3,000
Referees: Bruno Gasperin (FRA), Pierluigi D'Este (ITA)

27 February 1999
14:00

Boxscore

Ukraine	79–67	Belarus
Scoring by half: 40–35, 39–32
Pts: Iailo 26; Rebs: Lokhmanchuk 13; Asts: Kharchenko 5		Pts: Baidakou 20; Rebs: Koul 12; Asts: Radzionau 3

Arena of BC Kyiv, Kyiv
Attendance: 1,000
Referees: Vladimir Okhrimenko (RUS), Andrei Bostan (MDA)

27 February 1999
14:00

Boxscore

Denmark	63–80	Spain
Scoring by half: 31–40, 32–40
Pts: Larsen 15; Rebs: Bjerregaard 6 Asts: Hauge 6		Pts: Reyes Cabanas 12; Rebs: Paraiso Gonzalez 9 Asts: Angulo Espinosa 7

Vejle Idrætscenter, Vejle
Attendance: 1,000
Referees: Kestutis Pilipauskas (LTU), Nikolaos Mpotitsis (SWE)

27 February 1999
20:50

Boxscore

Israel	79–76	England
Scoring by half: 34–35, 45–41
Pts: Kattache 25; Rebs: Steinhauer 12; Asts: Henefeld 5		Pts: Bucknall 26; Rebs: Huggins 15; Asts: Bucknall 5

Sport Palace, Tel Aviv
Attendance: 5,000
Referees: Konstantinos Koromilas (GRE), György Varadi (HUN)

=== Group D ===
Team	Pld	W	L	PF	PA	PD	Pts	Tie
Bosnia and Herzegovina	10	9	1	787	717	+70	19	
Lithuania	10	8	2	829	637	+192	18	
Croatia	10	7	3	813	711	+102	17	
Estonia	10	3	7	817	864	−47	13	1–1, +15
Netherlands	10	3	7	737	841	−104	13	1–1, -15
Iceland	10	0	10	714	927	−213	10	

26 November 1997
18:00

Boxscore

Croatia	88–63	Estonia
Scoring by half: 43–31, 45–32
Pts: Mršić 20; Rebs: Radja 11; Asts: Mršić, Kelecevic 2		Pts: Metstak 24; Rebs: Kullamäe 3 Asts: Rumma, Pärn, Kullamäe 3

Brod Sports Hall, Slavonski Brod
Attendance: 2,000
Referees: Pierluigi D'Este (ITA), Miroslav Macela (CZE)

26 November 1997
18:00

Boxscore

Iceland	83–87	Netherlands
Scoring by half: 44–43, 39–44
Pts: Arnarson 19; Rebs: Bragason 6 Asts: Hardarson 4		Pts: Hammink 33; Rebs: Hammink 9 Asts: Van Rootselaar 9

Reykjavík
Referees: Fernand Hengel (LUX), Goran Radonjic (FRA)

26 November 1997
18:15

Boxscore

Lithuania	66–69	Bosnia and Herzegovina
Scoring by half: 39–37, 27–32
Pts: Stombergas 19; Rebs: Karnisovas, Stombergas 9 Asts: Lukminas 2		Pts: Markovic Zoric 19; Rebs: Alihodzic, Bekir, Mujezinovic 4 Asts: Firic 3

Vilnius
Attendance: 4,500
Referees: Carl Jungebrand (FIBA), Ivo Dolinek (CZE)

29 November 1997
19:00

Boxscore

Estonia	88–79	Iceland
Scoring by half: 51–38, 37–41
Pts: Metstak 18; Rebs: Rumma, Pärn, Pehka 8 Asts: Pehka 6		Pts: Örlygsson 27; Rebs: Bragason 7 Asts: Arnarson 2

Tallinn
Attendance: 1,960
Referees: Claes Ahammar (SWE), Boris Schmidt (GER)

29 November 1997
20:00

Boxscore

Netherlands	57–88	Lithuania
Scoring by half: 33–46, 24–42
Pts: Nahar 24; Rebs: Hammink 10; Asts: Hammink 6		Pts: Einikis 21; Rebs: Karnisovas 7 Asts: Timinskas 5

Topsportcentrum, Rotterdam
Attendance: 1,500
Referees: Antonio Coelho (POR), Alan Richardson (ENG)

29 November 1997
20:30

Boxscore

Bosnia and Herzegovina	74–67	Croatia
Scoring by half: 35–33, 39–34
Pts: Markovic Zoric 30; Rebs: Alihodzic 13; Asts: Markovic Zoric 3		Pts: Mršić 27; Rebs: Radja 10; Asts: Radja 2

Sarajevo
Attendance: 6,500
Referees: Peter Poiger (AUT), Giampaolo Cicoria (ITA)

3 Dec 1997
18:00

Boxscore

Iceland	74–82	Croatia
Scoring by half: 29–41, 45–41
Pts: Gudfinnsson 21; Rebs: Gudfinnsson 8 Asts: Örlygsson 7		Pts: Mulaomerović 19; Rebs: Zadravec 9 Asts: Mulaomerović 7

Reykjavík
Referees: Jan Harald Korshavn (NOR), Richard Stokes (ENG)

3 Dec 1997
18:15

Boxscore

Lithuania	87–77	Estonia
Scoring by half: 43–39, 44–38
Pts: Karnišovas 31; Rebs: Einikis 10; Asts: Karnisovas 5		Pts: Kullamäe 21; Rebs: Pärn 5 Asts: Liivak 4

Vilnius
Attendance: 3,500
Referees: Volodymyr Drabikovskyi (UKR), Aleksander Gorshkov (RUS)

3 Dec 1997
20:00

Boxscore

Netherlands	76–81	Bosnia and Herzegovina
Scoring by half: 36–38, 40–43
Pts: Hammink 27; Rebs: Hammink 7 Asts: Van Rootselaar, Bennes 5		Pts: Markovic Zoric 17; Rebs: Alihodzic 6 Asts: Bekir 11

Topsportcentrum, Rotterdam
Attendance: 2,000
Referees: Bruno Gasperin (FRA), Roger Schwarz (GER)

25 February 1998
19:00

Boxscore

Estonia	90–99	Netherlands
Scoring by half: 26–44, 64–55
Pts: Kullamäe 22; Rebs: Ilver 6 Asts: Pehka 3		Pts: Hammink 30; Rebs: Hammink 10; Asts: Van Rootselaar 6

Tallinn
Attendance: 1,200
Referees: Mika Moberg (FIN), Markus Hesse (GER)

25 February 1998
20:00

Boxscore

Bosnia and Herzegovina	109–84	Iceland
Scoring by half: 57–38, 52–46
Pts: Markovic Zoric 37; Rebs: Leric 10; Asts: Markovic Zoric 5		Pts: Örlygsson 23; Rebs: Bragason 5 Asts: Bragason 2

Sarajevo
Attendance: 6,500
Referees: Pavel Volejnik (CZE), Richard Führer (AUT)

25 February 1998
20:30

Boxscore

Croatia	72–64	Lithuania
Scoring by half: 40–37, 32–27
Pts: Radja 25; Rebs: Radja 12; Asts: Komazec 4		Pts: Praskevicius 16; Rebs: Praskevicius 6 Asts: Maskoliunas 3

Split
Attendance: 3,000
Referees: Mauro Pozzana (ITA), Viliam Koller (SVK)

28 February 1998
18:15

Boxscore

Lithuania	96–71	Iceland
Scoring by half: 47–34, 49–37
Pts: Praskevicius 25; Rebs: Praskevicius 10; Asts: Pacesas 5		Pts: Bragason 15; Rebs: Bragason 10; Asts: Ingvarsson 4

Vilnius
Attendance: 3,700
Referees: Konrad Tomczyk (POL), Vladimir Okhrimenko (RUS)

28 February 1998
19:00

Boxscore

Estonia	90–96	Bosnia and Herzegovina
Scoring by half: 39–56, 51–40
Pts: Pehka 25; Rebs: Metstak 6 Asts: Pehka 5		Pts: Markovic Zoric 21; Rebs: Alihodzic, Markovic Zoric, Firic 6 Asts: Firic 5

Tallinn
Attendance: 1,300
Referees: Lars Klaar (SWE), Krzysztof Koralewski (POL)

28 February 1998
19:30

Boxscore

Netherlands	67–79	Croatia
Scoring by half: 35–48, 32–31
Pts: Nahar 22; Rebs: Nahar 9 Asts: Van Rootselaar 6		Pts: Radja 25; Rebs: Radja 15; Asts: Komazec 3

Maaspoort, 's-Hertogenbosch
Attendance: 2,000
Referees: Hermann Latz (GER), Petr Sudek (SVK)

25 November 1998
18:00

Boxscore

Bosnia and Herzegovina	57–87	Lithuania
Scoring by half: 25–43, 32–44
Pts: Mujezinovic 18; Rebs: Alihodzic 7 Asts: Aydin, Markovic Zoric, Korlatović, Mirkovic 1		Pts: Sabonis 23; Rebs: Sabonis 10; Asts: Sabonis 2

Sarajevo
Attendance: 7,000
Referees: Tiziano Zancanella (ITA), Recep Ankarali (TUR)

25 November 1998
19:00

Boxscore

Estonia	76–82	Croatia
Scoring by half: 38–38, 38–44
Pts: Müürsepp 26; Rebs: Müürsepp 9 Asts: Kuusmaa 4		Pts: Komazec 33; Rebs: Tabak 8 Asts: Mršić 6

Tallinn
Attendance: 1,500
Referees: György Varadi (HUN), Nikolaos Mpotitsis (SWE)

25 November 1998
20:00

Boxscore

Netherlands	77–65	Iceland
Scoring by half: 41–30, 36–35
Pts: Van der Sluis 18; Rebs: Nahar 15; Asts: Heinen 6		Pts: Hauksson 21; Rebs: Örlygsson 6 Asts: Örlygsson 6

Topsportcentrum, Almere
Attendance: 1,100
Referees: Eric De Neve (BEL), Markus Hesse (GER)

28 November 1998
17:00

Boxscore

Lithuania	80–61	Netherlands
Scoring by half: 41–29, 39–32
Pts: Sabonis 17; Rebs: Sabonis 12; Asts: Jasikevicius 6		Pts: Hammink 20; Rebs: Heinen 7 Asts: Krieger, Heinen, Hammink 3

Vilnius
Attendance: 4,500
Referees: György Varadi (HUN), Mika Moberg (FIN)

28 November 1998
17:00

Boxscore

Iceland	79–100	Estonia
Scoring by half: 43–46, 36–54
Pts: Örlygsson, Arnarson 16; Rebs: Bragason 7 Asts: Bragason, F. Hardarson 4		Pts: Müürsepp 41; Rebs: Müürsepp 10; Asts: Kullamäe 12

Reykjavík
Referees: Geir Matthiasen (NOR), Roger Schwarz (GER)

28 November 1998
20:30

Boxscore

Croatia	64–67	Bosnia and Herzegovina
Scoring by half: 36–33, 28–34
Pts: Radja 27; Rebs: Radja 11; Asts: Mulaomerović 2		Pts: Marković Zorić 19; Rebs: Firić, Alihodžić, Mujezinović 7 Asts: Marković Zorić, Mujezinović 2

Split
Attendance: 3,000
Referees: Karel Bruna (CZE), Petr Sudek (SVK)

2 Dec 1998
18:00

Boxscore

Bosnia and Herzegovina	68–60	Netherlands
Scoring by half: 36–38, 32–22
Pts: Markovic Zoric 25; Rebs: Firic 10; Asts: Bekir 4		Pts: Van der Sluis 16; Rebs: Van Rijn 4 Asts: Bennes 1

Sarajevo
Attendance: 7,000
Referees: Nikolai Nedeltchev (BUL), Nikolaos Pitsilkas (GRE)

2 Dec 1998
18:00

Boxscore

Croatia	111–77	Iceland
Scoring by half: 62–44, 49–33
Pts: Mršić 26; Rebs: Grgat 10; Asts: Mršić 5		Pts: F. Hardarson 21; Rebs: Bragason 6 Asts: Örlygsson, F. Hardarson, Stefánsson, H. Harðarson 1

Šibenik
Attendance: 1,500
Referees: Gábor Missura (HUN), Andrej Lovsin (SLO)

2 Dec 1998
19:00

Boxscore

Estonia	60–91	Lithuania
Scoring by half: 33–45, 27–46
Pts: Pehka 11; Rebs: Noormets 6 Asts: Kuusmaa, Pehka 3		Pts: Stombergas 26; Rebs: Sabonis 8 Asts: Sabonis, Jasikevicius, Stombergas, Žukauskas, Maskoliunas 2

Tallinn
Attendance: 2,000
Referees: Igor Lebedev (RUS), Andrei Bostan (MDA)

24 February 1999
17:00

Boxscore

Iceland	54–83	Bosnia and Herzegovina
Scoring by half: 25–45, 29–38
Pts: Arnarson 16; Rebs: Bragason 6 Asts: Hardarson 3		Pts: Firic, Leric 15; Rebs: Mujezinovic 10; Asts: Bekir 7

Reykjavík
Attendance: 1,000
Referees: William Jones (WAL), Martin Hehir (IRL)

24 February 1999
19:30

Boxscore

Netherlands	80–104	Estonia
Scoring by half: 37–55, 43–49
Pts: Huijbens 21; Rebs: Huijbens 12; Asts: Bennes, Krieger 6		Pts: Kuusmaa 27; Rebs: Metstak 10; Asts: Kullamäe 7

Topsportcentrum, Almere
Attendance: 1,200
Referees: Armand De Keyser (BEL), Rikard Johansson (SWE)

24 February 1999
20:00

Boxscore

Lithuania	76–65	Croatia
Scoring by half: 40–35, 36–30
Pts: Karnisovas 15; Rebs: Einikis, Masiulis 5 Asts: Jasikevicius 6		Pts: Mršić 17; Rebs: Zadravec 8 Asts: Rimac 5

Kaunas
Attendance: 2,500
Referees: Kamen Toshev (BUL), Carl Jungebrand (FIBA)

27 February 1999
17:00

Boxscore

Iceland	48–94	Lithuania
Scoring by half: 29–49, 19–45
Pts: Arnarson 17; Rebs: Hauksson 5 Asts: Arnarson 3		Pts: Praskevicius 15; Rebs: Sestokas 8 Asts: Jasikevicius 5

Reykjavík
Referees: William Jones (WAL), Martin Hehir (IRL)

27 February 1999
20:30

Boxscore

Croatia	103–73	Netherlands
Scoring by half: 61–27, 42–46
Pts: Zadravec 20; Rebs: Vujcic 7 Asts: Zadravec, Kalamiza 5		Pts: Huijbens, Van der Sluis 20; Rebs: Zwikker 9 Asts: Van Rootselaar, Krieger, Van der Sluis 3

Rijeka
Attendance: 2,200
Referees: Fatih Dalay (TUR), Fabio Facchini (ITA)

28 February 1999
17:30

Boxscore

Bosnia and Herzegovina	83–69	Estonia
Scoring by half: 46–37, 37–32
Pts: Aydin 17; Rebs: Alihodzic, Mujezinovic 6 Asts: Markovic Zoric 7		Pts: Pehka 19; Rebs: Metstak 5 Asts: Kuusmaa 1

Sarajevo
Attendance: 7,000
Referees: Alberto Grossi (ITA), Memduh Öget (TUR)

=== Group E ===
Team	Pld	W	L	PF	PA	PD	Pts
Italy	10	8	2	823	659	+164	18
Turkey	10	8	2	774	658	+116	18
Czech Republic	10	6	4	757	770	−13	16
Sweden	10	5	5	793	830	−37	15
Latvia	10	3	7	778	800	−22	13
Georgia	10	0	10	685	893	−208	10

26 November 1997
15:30

Boxscore

Italy	96–84	Latvia
Scoring by half: 50–38, 46–46
Pts: Myers 28; Rebs: Chiacig 8 Asts: Bonora 3		Pts: Bagatskis 22; Rebs: Bondarenko, Grafs 3 Asts: Stelmahers 2

Catania
Attendance: 4,000
Referees: Serge De Coster (BEL), Dragan Neskovic (SRB)

26 November 1997
17:30

Boxscore

Turkey	65–48	Sweden
Scoring by half: 38–20, 27–28
Pts: Oyguç 14; Rebs: Türkcan 15; Asts: Ene 5		Pts: P. Larsson 14; Rebs: Sahlström 9 Asts: P. Larsson 3

Arena of Türk Telekom SC, Ankara
Attendance: 4,500
Referees: Goran Urukalo (CRO), Borys Shulga (UKR)

26 November 1997
18:00

Boxscore

Georgia	68–70	Czech Republic
Scoring by half: 32–34, 36–36
Pts: Natsvlishvili 24; Rebs: Stepania 14; Asts: Vashakidze, Sanadze, Chkheidze 1		Pts: Okác 32; Rebs: Becka 5 Asts: Czudek 3

Sports Palace, Tbilisi
Attendance: 7,000
Referees: Ryszard Glogowski (POL), Stylianos Koukoulekidis (GRE)

29 November 1997
16:00

Boxscore

Italy	84–60	Czech Republic
Scoring by half: 45–32, 39–28
Pts: Fucka 21; Rebs: Fucka 9 Asts: Pozzecco 4		Pts: Becka 21; Rebs: Becka 12; Asts: Becka, Czudek 2

Ferrara
Attendance: 4,500
Referees: Mateo Ramos (ESP), Almir Aksamija (BIH)

29 November 1997
16:00

Boxscore

Sweden	89–85	Georgia
Scoring by half: 46–54, 43–31
Pts: Aulander 23; Rebs: Blom 9 Asts: L. Larsson 11		Pts: Stepania 28; Rebs: Stepania 10; Asts: Vashakidze 6

Fyrishov Arena, Uppsala
Attendance: 1,200
Referees: Mika Moberg (FIN), Krzysztof Koralewski (POL)

29 November 1997
18:00

Boxscore

Latvia	74–84	Turkey
Scoring by half: 34–50, 40–34
Pts: Bagatskis 24; Rebs: Bagatskis 9 Asts: Sneps 4		Pts: Kutluay 24; Rebs: Türkcan 14; Asts: Sarica 4

Riga
Attendance: 3,000
Referees: Jozef Jancovic (SVK), Marek Nowicki(POL)

3 Dec 1997
15:30

Boxscore

Italy	92–81	Sweden
Scoring by half: 50–39, 42–42
Pts: Myers 36; Rebs: Galanda, Marconato 7 Asts: Galanda 3		Pts: P. Larsson 28; Rebs: Sahlström 9 Asts: Sahlström 4

Avellino
Attendance: 3,000
Referees: Srdan Dozai (CRO), Sasa Pukl (SLO)

3 Dec 1997
16:30

Boxscore

Czech Republic	77–69	Latvia
Scoring by half: 37–39, 40–30
Pts: Okác 28; Rebs: Becka, Okác 7 Asts: Becka, Czudek 2		Pts: Bagatskis 19; Rebs: Bondarenko, Helmanis, Vitols, Bagatskis 4 Asts: Valeiko 1

Opava
Attendance: 1,100
Referees: Leszek Rakoczy (POL), Andrej Jelen (SLO)

3 Dec 1997
18:00

Boxscore

Georgia	73–76	Turkey
Scoring by half: 38–45, 35–31
Pts: Natsvlishvili 33; Rebs: Stepania 10; Asts: Vashakidze, Sanadze 2		Pts: Kutluay 19; Rebs: Türkcan 18; Asts: Türkcan 4

Sports Palace, Tbilisi
Attendance: 6,000
Referees: Ion Olaru (ROU), Petr Sudek (SVK)

25 February 1998
18:00

Boxscore

Latvia	99–63	Georgia
Scoring by half: 58–35, 41–28
Pts: Bagatskis 24; Rebs: Bernats, Buskevics 6 Asts: Stelmahers 9		Pts: Shengelia 18; Rebs: Shengelia 8 Asts: Bezhanishvili 5

Arena of BK Ventspils, Ventspils
Attendance: 1,500
Referees: Andres Tobi (EST), Aleksander Gorshkov (RUS)

25 February 1998
18:00

Boxscore

Turkey	64–72	Italy
Scoring by half: 39–40, 25–32
Pts: Besok 17; Rebs: Türkcan 15; Asts: Ene 4		Pts: Myers 23; Rebs: Bonora, Marconato, Frosini 5 Asts: Bonora 8

Arena of Türk Telekom SC, Ankara
Attendance: 4,500
Referees: Dubravko Muhvic (CRO), Mikhail Davydov(RUS)

25 February 1998
19:00

Boxscore

Sweden	93–97 (OT)	Czech Republic
Scoring by half: 44–29, 31–46 Overtime: 9–9, 9–13
Pts: Sahlström 24; Rebs: Sahlström, Aulander, Stümer 7 Asts: Sahlström, L. Larsson, P. Larsson 3		Pts: Vahala 27; Rebs: Trnka 9 Asts: Klapetek 3

Lisebergshallen, Gothenburg
Referees: Kestutis Pilipauskas (LTU), Kurt Gjettermann (DEN)

28 February 1998
15:45

Boxscore

Italy	90–43	Georgia
Scoring by half: 47–21, 43–22
Pts: Sambugaro 14; Rebs: Marconato 11; Asts: Meneghin, Galanda 3		Pts: Shengelia 12; Rebs: Shengelia 10; Asts: Bezhanishvili 2

Siena
Attendance: 4,500
Referees: György Varadi (HUN), Marjan Stojovski (MKD)

28 February 1998
16:00

Boxscore

Sweden	87–82	Latvia
Scoring by half: 45–38, 42–44
Pts: Aulander 23; Rebs: Blom 5 Asts: L. Larsson 4		Pts: Bagatskis 21; Rebs: Helmanis, Bernats 5 Asts: Bernats 3

Arena of Magic M7, Borås
Attendance: 1,632
Referees: Leszek Rakoczy (POL), Armand DE Keyser (BEL)

28 February 1998
16:30

Boxscore

Czech Republic	67–74	Turkey
Scoring by half: 37–28, 30–46
Pts: Becka 16; Rebs: Becka 7 Asts: Czudek 4		Pts: Türkcan 28; Rebs: Türkcan 12; Asts: Sarica 1

Opava
Attendance: 1,200
Referees: Marek Nowicki (POL), Efim Resser (GER)

25 November 1998
17:00

Boxscore

Czech Republic	81–74	Georgia
Scoring by half: 32–42, 49–32
Pts: Zídek 34; Rebs: Zídek 17; Asts: Okác 4		Pts: Japaridze 22; Rebs: Natsvlishvili 7 Asts: Abramidze 2

Opava
Attendance: 1,200
Referees: Peter Poiger (AUT), Davorin Nakic (CRO)

25 November 1998
18:00

Boxscore

Latvia	64–62	Italy
Scoring by half: 42–31, 22–31
Pts: Bagatskis 16; Rebs: Bondarenko 7 Asts: Valeiko 4		Pts: De Pol 17; Rebs: Chiacig 11; Asts: Basile 5

Arena of BK Ventspils, Ventspils
Attendance: 3,000
Referees: Mika Moberg (FIN), Grzegorz Ziemblicki (POL)

25 November 1998
19:00

Boxscore

Sweden	64–90	Turkey
Scoring by half: 27–39, 37–51
Pts: Stümer 22; Rebs: Blom 9 Asts: Hakanson 4		Pts: Ene 25; Rebs: Türkcan, Besok 7 Asts: Türkcan 4

Pontushallen, Luleå
Attendance: 4,962
Referees: Carl Jungebrand (FIBA), Vladimir Okhrimenko (RUS)

28 November 1998
17:30

Boxscore

Turkey	78–65	Latvia
Scoring by half: 38–30, 40–35
Pts: Sarica 22; Rebs: Besok 24; Asts: Türkcan 3		Pts: Stelmahers 15; Rebs: Bernats 7 Asts: Stelmahers, Valeiko 2

Arena of Türk Telekom SC, Ankara
Attendance: 4,500
Referees: Tomislav Jovancic (SRB), Ido Bergman (ISR)

28 November 1998
18:00

Boxscore

Georgia	59–82	Sweden
Scoring by half: 43–37, 16–45
Pts: Japaridze 16; Rebs: Natsvlishvili 15; Asts: Natsvlishvili, Abramidze 2		Pts: Gehrke 26; Rebs: Blom 7 Asts: Bergström 3

Sports Palace, Tbilisi
Attendance: 3,000
Referees: Kamen Toshev (BUL), Marek Cmikiewicz (POL)

29 November 1998
14:00

Boxscore

Czech Republic	63–79	Italy
Scoring by half: 28–35, 35–44
Pts: Zídek 15; Rebs: Zídek 9 Asts: Czudek 1		Pts: Abbio 19; Rebs: Abbio 5 Asts: Abbio 1

Prague
Attendance: 1,000
Referees: Peter Klingbiel (GER), Stojan Fiser (SLO)

2 Dec 1998
17:30

Boxscore

Turkey	103–60	Georgia
Scoring by half: 43–26, 60–34
Pts: Türkcan 19; Rebs: Türkcan, Besok 9 Asts: Tunçeri 5		Pts: Chkheidze 18; Rebs: V. Natsvlishvili, Japaridze, Boisa 5 Asts: Jgenti 3

Atatürk Spor Salonu, Bursa
Attendance: 3,000
Referees: Moise Bitton (ISR), Nikola Lepetic (MNE)

2 Dec 1998
18:00

Boxscore

Latvia	60–73	Czech Republic
Scoring by half: 30–41, 30–32
Pts: Laksa 19; Rebs: Bernats 7 Asts: Miglinieks, Valeiko 5		Pts: Zídek 17; Rebs: Zídek 11; Asts: Zídek 5

Arena of BK Ventspils, Ventspils
Attendance: 1,800
Referees: Carl Jungebrand (FIBA), Nikolaos Agadakos (GRE)

2 Dec 1998
19:00

Boxscore

Sweden	82–75	Italy
Scoring by half: 39–46, 43–29
Pts: Gehrke 19; Rebs: Stümer 8 Asts: L. Larsson 5		Pts: Meneghin 18; Rebs: De Pol 6 Asts: Meneghin 5

Arena of Sundsvall Dragons, Sundsvall
Attendance: 2,036
Referees: Marek Nowicki (POL), Michel Zegwaard (NED)

24 February 1999
15:20

Boxscore

Italy	68–54	Turkey
Scoring by half: 37–26, 31–28
Pts: Chiacig 14; Rebs: Chiacig 10; Asts: Pozzecco 6		Pts: Kutluay 13; Rebs: Besok, Türkoglu 9 Asts: Türkoglu 4

Reggio Calabria
Attendance: 7,000
Referees: Petr Sudek (SVK), Milivoje Jovcic (SRB)

24 February 1999
16:00

Boxscore

Czech Republic	102–83	Sweden
Scoring by half: 49–38, 53–45
Pts: Zídek 36; Rebs: Zídek 9 Asts: Czudek 8		Pts: P. Larsson 17; Rebs: Sahlström 7 Asts: L. Larsson 4

Opava
Attendance: 1,200
Referees: Nikolaos Pitsilkas (GRE), Andreas Roth (AUT)

24 February 1999
18:00

Boxscore

Georgia	96–98	Latvia
Scoring by half: 38–50, 58–48
Pts: Chkheidze, Berdzenishvili 18; Rebs: Berdzenishvili, Karabaki 7 Asts: Abramidze 2		Pts: Bagatskis 27; Rebs: Laksa 6 Asts: Miglinieks 3

Sports Palace, Tbilisi
Attendance: 2,500
Referees: Roman Ryzhyk (UKR), Igor Lebedev (RUS)

27 February 1999
17:30

Boxscore

Turkey	86–67	Czech Republic
Scoring by half: 36–31, 50–36
Pts: Kutluay 21; Rebs: Besok 15; Asts: Besok 4		Pts: Becka 27; Rebs: Becka 5 Asts: Frana 4

Abdi ipekçi, Istanbul
Attendance: 6,500
Referees: Zoran Zlatevski (MKD), Reuven Virovnik (ISR)

27 February 1999
18:00

Boxscore

Latvia	83–84	Sweden
Scoring by half: 41–35, 42–49
Pts: Bagatskis 29; Rebs: Helmanis 8 Asts: Miglinieks 7		Pts: Sahlström 17; Rebs: Sahlström 8 Asts: P. Larsson 4

Arena of BK Ventspils, Ventspils
Attendance: 1,500
Referees: Tomislav Jovancic (SRB), Dubravko Muhvic (CRO)

27 February 1999
18:00

Boxscore

Georgia	64–105	Italy
Scoring by half: 31–54, 33–51
Pts: Boisa 17; Rebs: Karabaki, Abramidze, Japaridze, Boisa, Chkheidze 2 Asts: Chkheidze, Abramidze, Berdzenishvili, Karabaki 2		Pts: Chiacig 18; Rebs: Fucka 7 Asts: Pozzecco 3

Sports Palace, Tbilisi
Attendance: 5,220
Referees: Georgiy Valtchev (BUL), Miodrag Licina (SRB)
