= John Hudson (basketball, born 1954) =

American basketball player

Personal information
- Born: May 29, 1954

Career information
- College: Concord University (1975–76)
- NBA draft: 1976: 10th round, 158th overall pick
- Drafted by: Chicago Bulls
- Position: Center

Career history

Playing
- 1978–1979: KR
- 1981: KR

Coaching
- 1978–1979: KR women's

Career highlights
- As player: Icelandic champion (1979); Icelandic Cup (1979); WVIAC All-Tournament team (1976); As coach: Icelandic women's champion (1979)

John Hudson (born May 29, 1954) is a retired American professional basketball player. After being drafted by the Chicago Bulls in 1976, Hudson went on to gain considerable fame in Iceland as one of the first foreign born professional players in the country.

== College career ==
Hudson played college basketball for the Concord Mountain Lions from 1975 to 1976. In 1976, he was selected to the West Virginia Intercollegiate Athletic Conference All-Tournament team after averaging 21.5 points and 13.0 rebounds per game.

== Professional career ==
Hudson was drafted by the Chicago Bulls in the 10th round of the 1976 NBA draft but did not make the opening day roster. In August 1978, he signed with reigning Icelandic champions KR, becoming one of the first foreign born professional players to play in the Úrvalsdeild karla. On September 30, he scored 53 points against ÍS during the pre-season Reykjavík Basketball Tournament. In November, KR participated in an 8-team international tournament in Ireland which included English National Cup runner-up Coventry Team Fiat, Irish league champions UCD Marian and Scottis club Paisley that went on to win the Scottish Basketball Championship that season. KR finished third in the tournament, after beating Scottish champions Boroughmuir in the Bronze game. Hudson led the tournament in scoring, with 164 points in 5 games for an average of 32.8 points per game. In January, KR participated in another international tournament, this time in England, where it faced Cincinnati Oaks from the United States, Scottish champions Boroughmuir, and the hosts Team Ziebart, which went on to win the English National Basketball League that season. KR again finished third with Hudson averaging 28.0 points per game.

On March 14, 1979, Hudson was suspended for one game after a confrontation with a referee Guðbrandur Sigurðsson in KR's loss to Valur. The atmosphere after the game became heated, with fans throwing small objects towards the referees when the exited the court. Despite Hudson absence, KR defeated ÍS 85–79, behind Jón Sigurðsson 28 points, and kept their championship hopes alive.

On March 25, Hudson won the Icelandic Cup after KR beat long time nemesis ÍR, led by Paul Stewart, in the Cup final. In the game, which had heavy police presence due to violence by supporters in the stands at recent games, Hudson scored a team high 19 points.

On March 29, Hudson scored the game winning basket, with 32 seconds remaining, against Valur, securing KR's second consecutive national championship. In the game, he scored a team high 34 points. For the season he was second in scoring with 576 points in 19 games, although he had the highest points per game with 30.3, narrowly beating Mark Christensen's 30.0 points per game.

After having played in Greece, Hudson returned to KR in October 1981 to shore up the team's frontcourt while Stew Johnson was recovering from a finger injury. He left the team in November after averaging 19.5 points in 4 games.

== Coaching career ==
Alongside playing for the men's team, Hudson coached KR women's team during the 1978–1979 season. On April 2, he led them to the national championship after defeating ÍS, 55–48, in the title deciding game.
