= Sveinbjörn Claessen =

Icelandic basketball player and coach

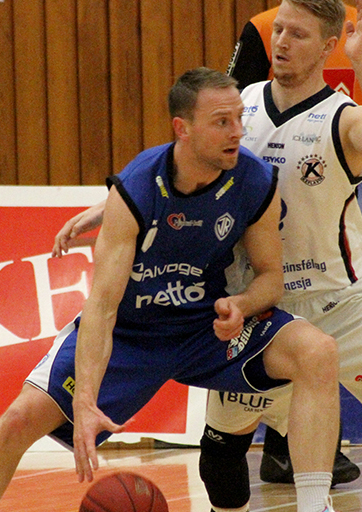
- Sveinbjörn Claessen in 2014

ÍR
- Title: Assistant coach
- League: Úrvalsdeild karla

Personal information
- Born: 22 February 1986 Reykjavík, Iceland
- Listed height: 195 cm (6 ft 5 in)
- Listed weight: 90 kg (198 lb)

Career information
- High school: Mira Mesa (San Diego, California)
- Playing career: 2004–2018; 2019–2020
- Position: Shooting guard / small forward
- Number: 5, 10

Career history

Playing
- 2004–2018: ÍR
- 2019–2020: ÍR

Coaching
- 2018–present: ÍR (assistant)

Career highlights
- Úrvalsdeild Domestic All-First Team (2008); Icelandic Cup winner (2007)

Sveinbjörn Claessen (born 22 February 1986) is an Icelandic basketball coach and a former member of the Icelandic men's national basketball team. Nicknamed Mr. ÍR, he has spent his entire career with Íþróttafélag Reykjavíkur, winning the Icelandic Cup with the club in 2007.

== Playing career ==
Sveinbjörn came up through the junior ranks of ÍR, spending one year playing with Mira Mesa Senior High School in San Diego, California at the age of 17. Originally a point guard, he moved to the wing position when he started playing for ÍR's senior team in the Úrvalsdeild karla during the 2004–2005 season.

He helped ÍR to victory in the Icelandic Cup finals in 2007, scoring 8 points and handing out 7 assists in the 83–81 victory against Hamar/Selfoss. The following season, he was named to the Úrvalsdeild Domestic All-First Team He helped ÍR reach the semi-finals in the playoffs where they led 2–0 against Keflavík, before collapsing and losing the next three games and the series.

In the second game of the 2009–2010 season, Sveinbjörn tore the anterior cruciate ligament in his left knee, causing him to miss the rest of the season. He returned in November 2010 and averaged 6.7 points in 14 regular season games, his lowest since his rookie season. He upped the averages to 14.3 points in the playoffs but was unable to prevent ÍR from being swept, 0–3, by Keflavík in the first round. In the third game of the 2011–2012 season, Sveinbjörn tore an anterior cruciate ligament again, this time in his right knee, and missed the rest of the season.

His best statistical season came in 2013–2014 when he averaged 19.9 points, scoring 20 points in 14 of his 22 games, tops among Icelandic players. He led ÍR to the Cup finals again during the season but they were unable to repeat their 2007 success, losing to Grindavík 89–77.

On 3 December 2015, he became the second ÍR player to reach 200 games in the Úrvalsdeild karla, after Eiríkur Önundarson who played 350 games for ÍR in the league.

During the 2017–2018 season, the recurrent knee injuries were starting to take their toll. Although he appeared in all 22 games of the regular season, he averaged a career low 4.0 points in 14 minutes per game. He subsequently retired after ÍR's loss against Tindastóll in the semi-finals of the playoffs that year.

Sveinbjörn made a comeback in October 2019 with ÍR. He was an unused substitute in a victory against Þór Akureyri on 25 October. On 15 November, he saw his first minutes since 2018 when he played 4 minutes, scoring 2 points, in a victory against Fjölnir.

== National team career ==
Sveinbjörn played 5 games for the Icelandic men's national basketball team from 2007 to 2009.
