= 1969 Úrvalsdeild karla =

1. deild karla^{1}
- Duration: January 19, 1969 – April 9, 1969
- Games played: 32
- Teams: 6

Regular season
- Relegated: ÍS

Finals
- Champions: ÍR (9th title)
- Runners-up: KR

Awards
- MVP: (Iceland) Þorsteinn Hallgrímsson

Statistical leaders
Points	(Iceland) Einar Bollason	31.8

Records
- Highest scoring: ÍR 109-58 ÍS
- ^{1} The league changed its name to Úrvalsdeild karla in 1978.

The 1969 Úrvalsdeild karla was the 18th season of the top tier men's basketball league on Iceland, then known as 1. deild karla. The season started on January 19, 1969 and ended on April 9, 1969.

ÍR won their ninth title by beating KR in an extra game for the championship after the two teams ended tied for the top place in the league.

ÍS got relegated after losing an extra game against KFR, 61–69.

== Competition format ==
The participating teams played each other twice for a total of 10 games. The top team won the national championship. If two teams were tied at the top at the end of the season, they would have to play an extra game to decide the national championship.

== Regular season ==
Pos	Team	Pld	W	L	PF	PA	PD	Pts	Qualification
1	ÍR	10	9	1	732	542	+190	18	Extra game for championship
2	KR	10	9	1	711	533	+178	18	Extra game for championship
3	Ármann	10	5	5	561	601	−40	10	
4	Þór Akureyri	10	3	7	585	606	−21	6	
5	KFR	10	2	8	553	684	−131	4	Extra game for Relegation
6	ÍS	10	2	8	483	659	−176	4	Extra game for Relegation

== Extra games ==
Relegation
KFR	69
ÍS	61

Championship
ÍR	68
KR	41
