= Natsvlishvili =

Natsvlishvili (Georgian: ნაცვლიშვილი) is a Georgian surname. Notable people with the surname include:

- Tako Natsvlishvili (born 1998), Georgian model
- Nicolay Natzvalov (Natsvlishvili), Russian general of Georgian origin
