= Mark Christensen (basketball) =

American basketball player

Personal information
- Born: November 23, 1952
- Listed height: 198 cm (6 ft 6 in)

Career information
- College: Kearney State (1971–75); Wilfrid Laurier (1975–76)
- Position: [[forward](basketball)|forward]]

Career history

Playing
- 1977–1979: Þór Akureyri
- 1979: → KR
- 1979–1980: ÍR

Coaching
- 1977–1979: Þór Akureyri
- 1980: Iceland (assistant)

Career highlights
- As player: Úrvalsdeild karla scoring champion (1979); OUAA First Team All-Star (1976)

Mark Christensen (born November 23, 1952) is an American former professional basketball player and coach. He led the Úrvalsdeild karla in scoring during the 1978–1979 season.

== Early life ==
Christensen grew up in Minden in Nebraska.

== College career ==
Christensen attendted Kearney State College from 1971 to 1975 where he scored 1,070 points over four seasons. He spent the 1975–1976 season with Wilfrid Laurier University in Waterloo, Ontario where he was selected to OUAA Men's Basketball First Team All-Star.

== Professional career ==
In 1977, Christensen was hired as a player-coach with Þór Akureyri. During his first season with Þór, he was the third leading scorer in the league with 363 points, averaging 25.9 points in 14 games. After finishing with a 4–10 record, Þór had to face Snæfell in two games for which team would play in the Úrvalsdeild karla the following season. Þór won both games with Christensen scoring 31 and 28 points in the outings.

In January 1979, Christensen was loaned to KR to participate international tournament in England, where it faced Cincinnati Oaks from the United States, Scottish champions Boroughmuir, and Team Ziebart, which went on to win the English National Basketball League that season. KR finished third in the tournament with Christensen averaging 25.3 points per game.

During his second season, he led the league in scoring with 600 points in 20 games. Despite his scoring prowess, Þór was relegated at the end of the season. Shortly later, Christensen signed with Úrvalsdeild club ÍR. In 20 games for ÍR, Christensen averaged 26.4 points per game.

=== Úrvalsdeild statistics ===
Season	Team	Games	Points	PPG
1977–78	Þór Akureyri	14	363	25.9
1978–79	Þór Akureyri	20	600	30.0
1979–80	ÍR	20	528	26.4
Samtals		54	1491	27.6

== Coaching career ==
Christensen coached Þór Akureyri from 1977 to 1979, accumulating a 7–27 record. He served as an assistant coach to the Icelandic men's national basketball team during the 1980 Polar Cup championships.
