= Gunnar Sverrisson =

Icelandic basketball player and coach

Personal information
- Born: 19 April 1970 (age 56) Iceland

Career information
- Playing career: 1989–1996
- Coaching career: 1994–present

Career history

Playing
- 1989–1991: ÍR
- 1992–1994: ÍR
- 1995–1996: ÍR

Coaching
- 1994–1996: ÍR (assistant)
- 1996–1997: Þór Akureyri (assistant)
- 1997–1998: Þór Akureyri
- 2005–2006: ÍR (assistant)
- 2010–2012: ÍR
- 2012–2013: KR (assistant)
- 2018–2019: Fjölnir (assistant)

Career highlights
- As assistant: 1. deild kvenna (2019)

Gunnar Sverrisson (born 19 April 1970) is an Icelandic professional basketball coach and former player.

== Playing career ==
Gunnar played three seasons in the Icelandic top-tier Úrvalsdeild karla and two seasons in the 1. deild karla for ÍR from 1989 to 1996.

== Coaching career ==
In 1994, Gunnar was hired as an assistant coach to player-coach John Rhodes with ÍR in 1994, where he served until 1996.

In September 1996, Gunnar was hired as an assistant coach with Þór Akureyri, assisting player-coach Fred Williams. On 23 February 1997, he was involved in two car accidents in a four hours span while returning to Akureyri after Þór's game against Breiðablik in Kópavogur. The first accident occurred in Hvalfjörður around midnight when one of the teams minibuses, in which Gunnar was in the front passenger seat, was sent swerving and flipped over due to heavy wind. The seven occupants of the car, which were all wearing seatbelts, escaped serious injuries although one of the passengers went halfway through a window. With the help of Skallagrímur fans, who were returning from a game in Keflavík, Gunnar and the other occupants of the bus were driven to Borgarnes. Half of the team and staff decided to take the second minibus and continue to Akureyri while the other half stayed in Borgarnes. Around 04:00 the minibus swerved of the road due to a blizzard. Gunnar and team captain Konráð Óskarsson had to hike through the storm to a nearby farm to seek assistance. After being towed free by the Hvammstangi police, the minibus finally arrived at Akureyri at 08:00 in the morning.

In June 1997, he was hired as head coach to Þór Akureyri for the 1997–1998 season. He returned to ÍR for the 2005–2006 season as an assistant coach to Jón Örn Guðmundsson.

Gunnar took over as head coach of Úrvalsdeild club ÍR on 4 January 2010, replacing Jón Arnar Ingvarsson who had resigned for family reasons. He guided the club to the playoffs during his first two seasons at the helm. He left the club at the conclusion of his contract after the 2011–2012 season.

He served as an assistant coach to player-coach Helgi Már Magnússon for KR during the 2012–2013 Úrvalsdeild karla season. He was fired by the board on 4 March during a reshuffle of the coaching staff and replaced by Finnur Freyr Stefánsson.

Gunnar served as an assistant coach for Fjölnir during the 2018–2019 season, helping them finish first in the 1. deild kvenna.

== Photography ==
Alongside basketball, Gunnar has worked as a photographer since the age of sixteen when he started working as sports photographer for Dagblaðið.
