= Eiríkur Önundarson =

Icelandic basketball player (born 1974)

Personal information
- Born: 19 September 1974 (age 52) Iceland
- Listed height: 186 cm (6 ft 1 in)
- Listed weight: 82 kg (181 lb)

Career information
- Playing career: 1991–2012
- Position: Point guard
- Number: 14

Career history

Playing
- 1991–1998: ÍR
- 1998–1999: KR
- 1999–2000: Holbæk
- 2000–2012: ÍR

Coaching
- 2008–2009: ÍR (assistant)

Career highlights
- As player: 2× Úrvalsdeild Domestic All-First Team (2001, 2003); 2× Icelandic Cup winner (2001, 2007); Úrvalsdeild three-point percentage leader (1996)

Career Úrvalsdeild karla statistics
- Points: 5,162 (13.8 ppg)
- Rebounds: 1,045 (2.8 rpg)
- Assists: 1,314 (3.5 apg)

Eiríkur Sverrir Önundarson (born 19 September 1974) is an Icelandic former basketball player and a former member of the Icelandic men's national basketball team. He spent 19 of his 21 seasons with Íþróttafélag Reykjavíkur where he won the Icelandic Cup in 2001 and 2007.

== Playing career ==
Eiríkur came up through the junior programs of Íþróttafélag Reykjavíkur. He played his first games with the senior team at the age of 17 during the 1991–1992 1. deild karla season. He appeared in 16 games during the season, averaging 10.1 points per game. In 1994, ÍR reached the 1. deild finals where the team faced Þór Akureyri. After losing the first game of the series, 105–82, he helped force game three by scoring 24 points in a 105–83 victory in game two. In the third and deciding game of the series, Þór secured a convincing 98–84 victory, winning the 1. deild championship and promotion to the Úrvalsdeild karla. However, after the season it was decided to expand the Úrvalsdeild to twelve teams, meaning ÍR was promoted as well.

After the departure of John Rhodes and Herbert Arnarson in 1996, Eiríkur became the leader of ÍR team. He was second on the team in scoring, averaging 16.8 points per game and led the league in three-point percent, shooting 52.0 percent from three-point range.

After reaching the playoffs for three consecutive from 1995 to 1997, ÍR was relegated back to 1. deild karla after the 1997–1998 season. Not wanting to play in the second-tier, Eiríkur opted to sign with Reykjavík rivals KR prior to the 1998–1999 season.

In July 1999, Eiríkur signed with Holbæk in the Danish Basketligaen. He helped Holbæk avoid relegation by scoring 30 points in a 76–88 victory against Horsens BC in the last game of the season. After the season, Eiríkur returned to ÍR which had been promoted back to the Úrvalsdeild. In February 2001, he led ÍR to the Icelandic Cup finals after scoring 27 points and having 7 steals in ÍR's 77–97 victory against Grindavík in the semi-finals. In the Cup finals game, Eiríkur scored 18 points and set a Cup finals record with 11 assists, helping ÍR to a 91–83 victory against Hamar. It was ÍR's first Cup title, it had lost inn all its previous five trips to the Cup finals.

On 20 October 2003, he scored a career-high 45 points in ÍR's 111–107 victory against Keflavík in the Úrvalsdeild.

In 2007, he helped ÍR win its second Cup title.

After contemplating retirement, he re-signed with ÍR for the 2008–2009 season as a player and an assistant coach to Jón Arnar Ingvarsson.

He retired as ÍR's all-time leader in games played in the Úrvalsdeild karla.

== National team career ==
Eiríkur played 27 games for the Icelandic men's national basketball team from 1996 to 2004.

== Awards and honors ==
=== Titles ===
- 2× Icelandic Cup winner: 2001, 2007

=== Awards ===
- 2× Úrvalsdeild Domestic All-First Team: 2001, 2003

=== Achievements ===
- Úrvalsdeild three-point percentage leader: 1996
- All-time Íþróttafélag Reykjavíkur leader in Úrvalsdeild games (350)
