= Jakob Sigurðarson =

Icelandic basketball player (born 1982)

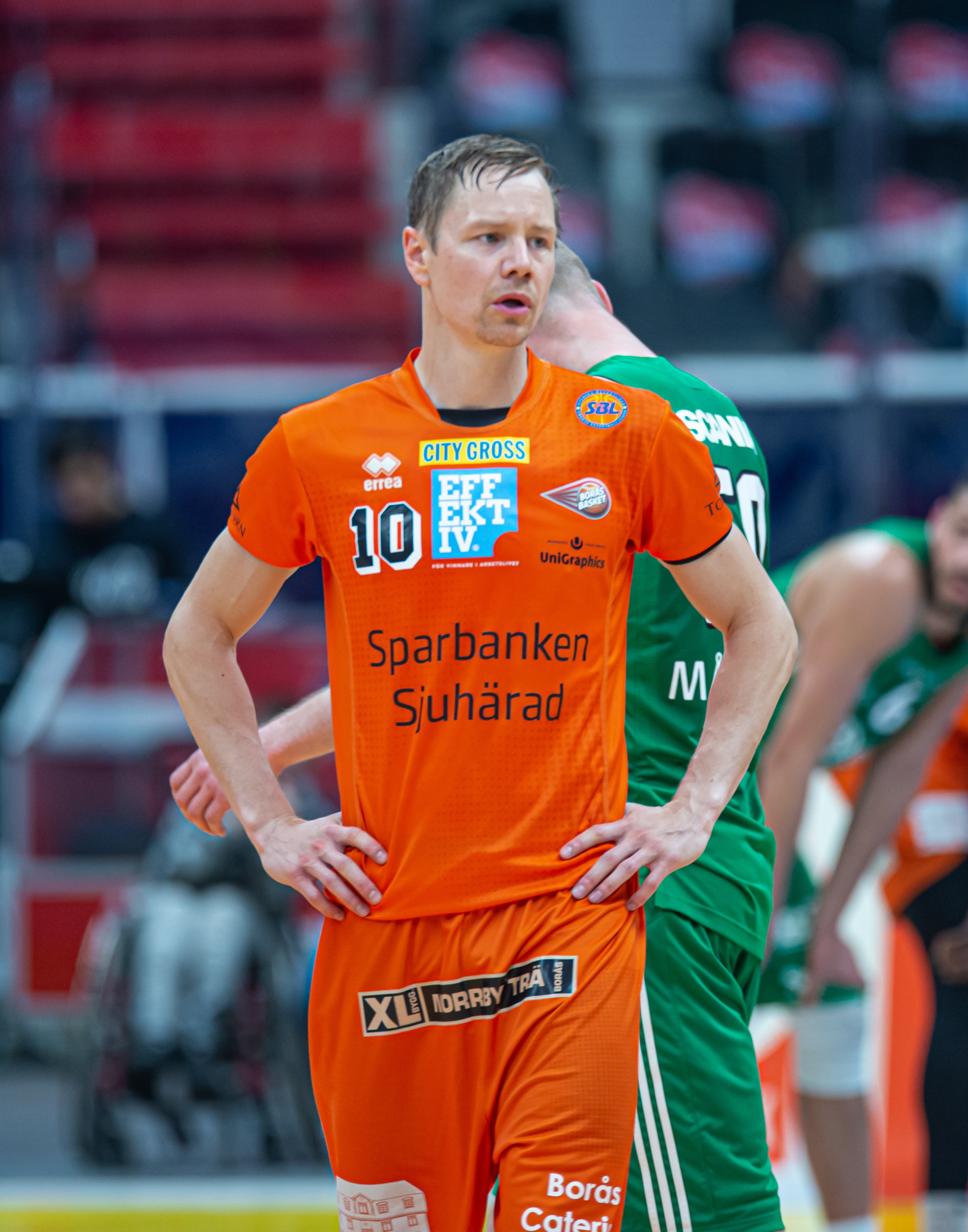
- Sigurðarson playing with Borås in 2019

KR
- Title: Head coach
- League: Úrvalsdeild karla

Personal information
- Born: 4 April 1982 (age 44) Reykjavík, Iceland
- Listed height: 1.92 m (6 ft 4 in)
- Listed weight: 82 kg (181 lb)

Career information
- High school: Westminster Academy (Fort Lauderdale, Florida)
- College: Birmingham–Southern (2001–2005)
- Playing career: 1998–2021
- Position: Point guard / shooting guard
- Coaching career: 2021–present

Career history

Playing
- 1998–2000: KR
- 2005–2006: Bayer Giants Leverkusen
- 2006–2007: Ciudad de Vigo
- 2007–2008: Kecskeméti KSE
- 2008–2009: KR
- 2009–2015: Sundsvall Dragons
- 2015–2019: Borås
- 2019–2021: KR

Coaching
- 2021–2023: KR (assistant)
- 2023–present: KR

Career highlights
- As player: Icelandic men's basketball player of the year (2011); Úrvalsdeild Domestic All-First Team (2009); 2x Icelandic champion (2000, 2009); Swedish champion (2011); Icelandic Company Cup (2008)
Medals
Men's basketball
Representing Iceland
Games of the Small States of Europe
Silver medal – second place	2015 Reykjavík	Team

Jakob Örn Sigurðarson (born 4 April 1982) is an Icelandic basketball coach and former player. He was named the Icelandic men's basketball player of the year in 2011. Jakob won the Icelandic championship in 2000 and 2009, and the Swedish championship in 2011.

== Playing career ==
Jakob Started his senior team career with KR in 1998 and won the Icelandic championship with the team in 2000. The following season he went to the United States and played high school basketball in Fort Lauderdale, Florida for one season before and played basketball at Birmingham–Southern College, Alabama, for four years.

He joined Bayer Giants Leverkusen in 2005 split the next three years with Bayer, Ciudad de Vigo and Kecskeméti KSE before rejoining KR in 2008. He went on to win the Icelandic cahmpionship for the second time in 2009.

Jakob then went on to play in Sweden for 10 years, first with Sundsvall Dragons from 2009 to 2015 and then with Borås Basket until 2019.

In May 2019, Jakob returned Iceland and signed with KR along with his brother Matthías Orri Sigurðarson. On 5 January 2020, KR announced that he would miss significant time due to a slipped disk in his back.

Jakob announced his retirement from basketball following KR's loss against Keflavík in the semi-finals of the 2021 Úrvalsdeild playoffs.

== National team career ==
Jakob debuted for the Icelandic national basketball team in 2000 and participated with them in EuroBasket 2015. In August 2016, he declared his retirement from international play. However, in November 2017, he returned to the national team and played with it until 2018. In his 18-year national team career, he played 92 games for Iceland.

== Coaching career ==
In August 2021, Jakob was hired as an assistant coach with KR. Following KR's relegation to the second-tier 1. deild karla, Jakob was hired as the head coach of the team.

== Personal life ==
Jakob is the older brother of professional basketball player Matthías Orri Sigurðarson.
