= Matthías Orri Sigurðarson =

Icelandic basketball player

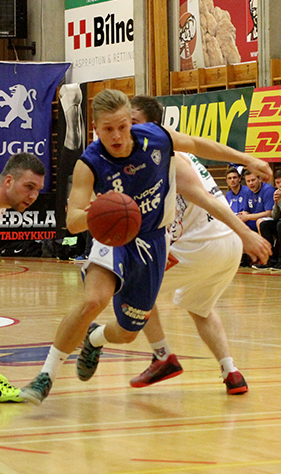
- Matthías Orri with ÍR in 2015

Personal information
- Born: 29 September 1994 (age 32) Reykjavík, Iceland
- Listed height: 183 cm (6 ft 0 in)
- Listed weight: 84 kg (185 lb)

Career information
- High school: Mountain Brook (Mountain Brook, Alabama)
- College: Flagler (2012–2013); Columbus State (2015–2016)
- Playing career: 2010–2021
- Position: Point guard
- Number: 8, 11

Career history
- 2010–2011: KR
- 2013–2015: ÍR
- 2018–2019: ÍR
- 2019–2021: KR
- 2022: KR-b
- 2022–2023: KR

Career highlights
- Icelandic league champion (2011); Icelandic Cup (2011); Úrvalsdeild Domestic All-First Team (2017, 2019)
Medals
Men's basketball
Representing Iceland
Games of the Small States of Europe
Bronze medal – third place	2017 San Marino	Team

Matthías Orri Sigurðarson (born 29 September 1994) is an Icelandic basketball player, sports commentator and a former member of the Icelandic men's national basketball team.

== Playing career ==
After starting his career with KR in 2010, Matthías Orri had is breakout season with ÍR in 2013–2014 when he averaged 16.8 points and 6.7 assists. In 2014–2015, he upped his scoring average to 19.2 points while also averaging 5.9 assists and 5.6 rebounds.

After spending the 2015–2016 season with Columbus State University, Matthías resigned with ÍR on 13 May 2016.

In April 2017, Matthías signed a 2-year contract extension with ÍR.

After helping ÍR reach the Úrvalsdeild finals in 2019, where it lost to KR, Matthías was named to the Úrvalsdeild Domestic All-First Team.

On 29 May 2019, Matthías signed with KR along with his brother Jakob Sigurðarson.

In August 2021, Matthías stated that he was unsure if he would play for KR during the seasons as his passion for basketball had diminished considerably. After sitting out the 2021–2022 season, he joined KR's reserve team, KR-b, ahead of the 2022–2023 season. On 16 October 2022, he had 4 points and 5 assists for KR-b against KR in the Icelandic Cup. On 20 December 2022, it was reported that he had resumed training with KR's senior team. On 29 December 2022, Matthías played his first game for the senior team in almost two years.

== National team career ==
Matthías played his first games for the senior national team at the 2017 Games of the Small States of Europe, helping Iceland win bronze.

== TV career ==
Since his semi-retirement from playing, Matthías has worked as a basketball analyst at Stöð 2's Körfuboltakvöld and as a commentator at RÚV.

== Personal life ==
Matthías is the younger brother of professional basketball player Jakob Sigurðarson.
