= Sotiris Nikolaidis =

Greek basketball player

Personal information
- Born: May 25, 1974 (age 52) Thessaloniki, Greece
- Listed height: 6 ft 1.25 in (1.86 m)
- Listed weight: 181 lb (82 kg)

Career information
- Playing career: 1995–2010
- Position: Point guard / Shooting guard
- Coaching career: 2010–present

Career history

Playing
- 1995–2000: PAOK
- 2000–2001: Maroussi
- 2001–2002: Napoli
- 2002–2003: Iraklis
- 2003–2005: AEK
- 2005–2006: Maroussi
- 2006–2007: AEK
- 2007–2008: Rethymno
- 2008–2009: Ilysiakos
- 2009–2010: Apollon Patras

Coaching
- 2010–2012: HANTH (youth)
- 2012–2013: MENT
- 2013–2014: Trikala Aries (assistant)
- 2014–2016: Stratoni
- 2016–2018: HANTH
- 2019–2020: Pefkochori
- 2020: Ionikos Nikaias (assistant)
- 2022–2023: Lavrio (assistant)

Career highlights
- As player: FIBA Saporta Cup champion (2001); Greek Cup winner (1999)
Medals
Men's basketball
Representing Greece
FIBA Europe Under-16 Championship
Silver medal – second place	1991 Greece	Under-16

Sotiris "Sotos" Nikolaidis (Greek: Σωτήρης "Σώτος" Νικολαΐδης; (born May 25, 1974, in Thessaloniki, Greece), is a retired Greek professional basketball player and current basketball coach. During his club playing career, at a height of 1.86 m (6'1 1/4") tall, he played at the point guard and shooting guard positions.

== Professional career ==
Nikolaidis started his youth basketball career in Greece, with HAN Thessaloniki. In 1995, he transferred to the Greek Basket League club PAOK Thessaloniki, where he played for five years. With PAOK, he also played three seasons in Europe's top level competition, the FIBA EuroLeague (1997–98, 1998–99, 1999–00). Moreover, Nikolaidis also won the Greek Cup title with PAOK, in 1999.

In 2000, he moved to the Greek club Maroussi Athens, and with them he won the European-wide secondary level FIBA Saporta Cup's 2000–01 season championship. Nikolaidis was the hero of the 2001 FIBA Saporta Cup Final, after he scored the game's two winning points, with free throws made 15 seconds before the end of the game. He also played in the Greek Basket League with Iraklis Thessaloniki, AEK Athens, and Rethymno. With AEK, he also played two seasons in Europe's top level EuroLeague (2003–04 and 2004–05).

Nikolaidis then played with Ilysiakos Athens in the Greek 2nd Division, and in the semi-pro level Greek 3rd Division, with Apollon Patras. He ended his club playing career in the Greek minor leagues, with HAN Thessaloniki.

== National team career ==
With Greece's Under-16 junior national team, Nikolaidis won the silver medal at the 1991 FIBA Europe Under-16 Championship. He also played in one cap (game) with the senior Greek national basketball team, in a game against Belgium, at the 1999 FIBA EuroBasket qualification tournament.

== Personal life ==
His sons Alexandros and Apostolos also became professional basketball players.
