= 1955 Úrvalsdeild karla (basketball) =

Icelandic Basketball Tournament^{1}
- Duration: 18 March 1955 – 25 March 1955
- Games played: 6
- Teams: 3

Finals
- Champions: ÍR (2nd title)
- Runners-up: Gosi

Records
- Highest scoring: ÍR 52-26 ÍS (18 March 1954)
- Winning streak: ÍR, Gosi; 2 games
- ^{1} The league changed its name to Úrvalsdeild karla in 1978.

The 1955 Icelandic Basketball Tournament was the 4th season of the top tier men's basketball league in Iceland. The season started on 18 March 1955 and ended on 25 March 1955. ÍR won its second title by posting the best record in the league.

== Competition format ==
The participating teams played each other once for a total of 3 games. The top team won the national championship.

== Results ==
Team 1	Score	Team 2
Gosi	34–32	ÍKF
ÍR	51–26	ÍS
ÍR	31–22	ÍKF
Gosi	22–17	ÍS
ÍS	26–40	ÍKF
ÍR	37–37	Gosi

== Table ==
Pos	Team	Pld	W	D	L	PF	PA	PD	Pts	Qualification or relegation
1	ÍR	3	2	1	0	119	85	+34	5	Champion
2	Gosi	3	2	1	0	92	86	+6	5	
3	ÍKF	3	1	0	2	94	91	+3	2	
4	ÍS	3	0	0	3	61	113	−52	0	
