= 1954 Úrvalsdeild karla =

Icelandic Basketball Tournament^{1}
- Duration: April 26, 1954 – April 28, 1954
- Games played: 3
- Teams: 3

Finals
- Champions: ÍR (1st title)
- Runners-up: ÍKF

Records
- Highest scoring: ÍR 43-24 Gosi (26 April 1954)
- Winning streak: ÍR; 2 games
- ^{1} The league changed its name to Úrvalsdeild karla in 1978.

The 1954 Icelandic Basketball Tournament was the 3rd season of the top tier men's basketball league in Iceland. The season started on April 26, 1954 and ended on April 28, 1954. ÍR won its first title by posting the best record in the league.

== Competition format ==
The participating teams played each other once for a total of 2 games. The top team won the national championship.

== Results ==
26 April 1954

ÍR	43–24	Gosi

Hálogaland, Reykjavík

27 April 1954

ÍKF	23–20	Gosi

Hálogaland, Reykjavík

28 April 1954

ÍR	32–24 (Note: Þjóðviljinn lists the final score as 31–23 while the Icelandic Basketball Association lists it as 32–24.)	ÍKF

Hálogaland, Reykjavík

== Regular season ==
Pos	Team	Pld	W	L	PF	PA	PD	Pts	Qualification or relegation
1	ÍR	2	2	0	75	48	+27	4	Champion
2	ÍKF	2	1	1	47	52	−5	2	
3	Gosi	2	0	2	44	66	−22	0	
