= Vakhtang Natsvlishvili =

Georgian basketball player

Personal information
- Born: January 28, 1976 (age 50) Tbilisi, Georgia
- Listed height: 6 ft 9 in (2.06 m)
- Listed weight: 220 lb (100 kg)

Career information
- College: Boston College (1995–1996)
- NBA draft: 1998: undrafted
- Playing career: 1990–2009
- Position: Power forward
- Number: 13

Career history
- 1990–1993: Martve Tbilisi
- 1993–1995: Cactus Tbilisi
- 1996–1997: Vita Tbilisi
- 1997–1998: Cherno More Port Varna
- 1998: Karşıyaka Basket
- 1999: CB Villa de Los Barrios
- 1999–2000: Bnei Herzliya
- 2000–2001: Basco Batumi
- 2001–2003: Oliveirense
- 2003–2007: Dijon Basket
- 2008–2009: Aviamsheni Tbilisi

Career highlights
- 3× Georgian Superliga champion (1996, 1997, 2001); Bulgarian Championship champion (1998); Portuguese Basketball Cup winner (2003); Portuguese League Cup winner (2003); Portuguese SuperCup winner (2003); LNB_Pro_A_Leaders_Cup winner (2004); FIBA_EuroCup_Challenge finalist 2004; 2003–04_FIBA_Europe_Cup runners-up; French Basketball Cup winner (2006); Match des Champions winner (2006)

Vakhtang "Vato" Natsvlishvili. (Georgian: ვახტანგ "ვატო" ნაცვლიშვილი) (born January 28, 1976) is a retired Georgian professional basketball player. He was the captain of Georgian National Basketball Team from 1997 till 2007.

== Career ==
Throughout his career, Vato Natsvlishvili has played in different European basketball clubs. He represented the Georgian national basketball team from 1994 to 2007 as well. Later in his career, Natsvlishvili played in Georgia. His best career game with the national team was against Turkey on 3 December 1997, he scored 33 points with 8 rebounds.

== Personal life ==
Natsvilishvili is married to a model Nino Tskitishvili, a sister of basketball player Nika Tskitishvili. His daughter, Tako is a model as well.
