= Pedro Miguel Neves =

Portuguese basketball player

Pedro Miguel Rodrigues Neves (born 10 August 1968 in Sé - Porto, Portugal), commonly known as Pedro Miguel, is a Portuguese former professional basketball player. He played at the point guard and shooting guard positions.

== Professional career ==
Miguel first played basketball with the Portuguese clubs Vasco da Gama and FC Porto. He then achieved the best results of his career while playing with the Portuguese club Benfica, during Benfica's golden basketball era, being one of their best players, along with Carlos Lisboa and Jean-Jacques. During this time, he won 5 Portuguese League national domestic league championships, from 1991 to 1995, and 5 Portuguese Cups. Miguel was the captain of Benfica, when he had to retire from playing professional basketball, in April 2000, at the age of only 31, due to a serious injury.

== Portuguese national team ==
Miguel was one of the best players of the senior men's Portuguese national basketball team, from 1988 to 1998. He played in 84 games.
