= Tako Natsvlishvili =

Georgian female model

- Born: 9 October 1998 (age 27); Tbilisi, Georgia
- Occupation: Model
- Known for: Giorgio Armani
- Spouse: Otar Khurodze (m. 2023)
- Parent: Nino Tskitishvili (Mother) Vato Natsvlishvili (Father)
- Relatives: Nikoloz Tskitishvili (uncle)
- Modeling information
- Height: 5 ft 10 in (1.78 m)
- Agency: NEXT Model Management (New York, Paris); Uno Models (Barcelona); Iconic Management (Berlin); IMM Bruxelles (Brussels); Elite Model Management (Copenhagen); Modellink (Gothenburg); Dolls Model Management (Taipei)
- Website: www.takonats.com

Tako Natsvlishvili (Georgian: თაკო ნაცვლიშვილი; born 9 October 1998) is a Georgian model. Born and raised in Georgia, she pursued her modeling career in New York City. She is known for her association with Giorgio Armani. Tako is currently signed with Next Management modeling agency.

== Early life ==
She was born in Tbilisi, Georgia. She started modelling when she was 14 years old. She has two brothers and one sister.

== Career ==
At 14 she was discovered by NEXT Model Management in Georgia. Tako walked fashion shows for Versace, Giorgio Armani, Dolce & Gabbana, Elie Saab, Ralph & russo, Christian Dior, Emilia Wickstead, Julien Mcdonald, Yohji Yamamoto, Ermanno Scervino, Moncler, Antonio Berardi, Roland Mouret, Hogan, Genny, Blugirl.

Tako recently became the new face for Armani Collezioni Spring-Summer 2016 collection.

She has also posed in Zuhair Murad Bridal collection 2016.
