= Paul Stewart (basketball) =

Scottish-American basketball player

Personal information
- Born: 28 October 1956 (age 70) Glasgow, Scotland
- Listed height: 6 ft 6 in (1.98 m)

Career information
- High school: San Diego (San Diego, California)
- College: Santa Ana (197?–1975); Cal State LA (1975–1977)
- NBA draft: 1977: undrafted
- Position: Forward / center
- Number: 15

Career history

Playing
- 1977–1978: USC Freiburg
- 1978–1979: ÍR
- 1979–1980: Team Fiat
- 1981–1982: Ovaltine

Coaching
- 1978–1979: ÍR

Career highlights
- First-team CCAA (1977)

Paul Stewart (born 28 October 1956) is a Scottish-American former professional basketball player and a former member of the Scottish national basketball team.

== Early life ==
Stewart was born in Glasgow to Scottish parents but moved to Canada shortly later. When he was 7 years old, his family moved again, this time to San Diego in California. He played college basketball for Santa Ana College before transferring to Cal State LA in 1975. In 1977 he made the CCAA All-First team.

== Playing career ==
=== Professional career ===
After graduating, Stewart had a tryout with the Portland Trail Blazers. After failing to get a contract with the Blazers, he signed with USC Freiburg in West Germany.

In August 1978, he signed with ÍR of the Icelandic Úrvalsdeild karla as a player-coach. In his first game for ÍR, Stewart scored 46 points in a 100-88 victory against ÍS in the pre-season Reykjavík Basketball Tournament. He finished as the third highest scorer in the tournament with 166 points in 5 games. On 13 October, Stewart got into an altercation with Njarðvík's Stefán Bjarkason in a game played at the Naval Air Station Keflavik which ended with both Military Police and Icelandic Police being called to the scene. After the fight, Stefán was transported to the base hospital where he received 6 stitches to his face. Although the game was part of an unofficial tournament, the Icelandic Basketball Federation disciplinary court suspended Stewart for three weeks which meant that he would miss two games in the Úrvalsdeild, including a game against Njarðvík. The verdict was highly controversial as it was only based on police statements from Stefán and Narðvík's assistant coach, Ingi Gunnarsson. Without Stewart, ÍR defeated Njarðvík, 95-89, with Stefán being booed loudly by the ÍR fans whenever he touched the ball. As ÍR's game against KR was postponed until December, allowing Stewart to play in it as his suspension was up.

Although he was hampered by a knee injury for much of the season, Stewart averaged 26.8 points per game, good for fourth best in the league. In the Icelandic Cup, ÍR advanced to the finals after beating Njarðvík, 96-95, in the semi-finals behind Stewart's and Jón Jörundsson's play. In the finals, ÍR met KR in the Laugardalshöll. The game, which had heavy police presence due to violence by supporters in the stands at recent games, ended with a convincing 87-72 KR victory despite Stewart's 26 points.

The following seasons he played for Team Fiat and Ovaltine in England.

=== National team career ===
In 1979, Stewart was selected to the Scottish national basketball team. On 30 April 1982, Stewart had 26 points and 18 rebounds in a 77-64 victory against Iceland in the EuroBasket 1983 qualification.

== Coaching career ==
Stewart served as a player-coach for ÍR during the 1978-1979 season. He was a candidate for the head coach position of the Icelandic men's national team for its 1979 games but the job ultimately went to Tim Dwyer.
