= Þorsteinn Hallgrímsson =

Icelandic basketball player

Personal information
- Born: 25 July 1942 (age 84) Kingdom of Iceland

Career information
- Playing career: 1959–1980
- Position: Forward

Career history

Playing
- 1959–1965: ÍR
- 1965–1968: SISU BK
- 1968–1971: ÍR
- 1971–1975: SISU BK
- 1975–1977: ÍR
- 1980: ÍR

Coaching
- 1976–1977: ÍR

Career highlights
- As player: Icelandic Team of the 20th century; 2x Úrvalsdeild Player of the Year (1969, 1971); 9x Icelandic champion (1960–1964, 1969–1971, 1977); 4x Danish champion (1966, 1967, 1972, 1973); As coach: Icelandic champion (1977)

Þorsteinn Hallgrímsson (born 25 July 1942) is an Icelandic former basketball player. Nicknamed Doddi, he won the Icelandic championship nine times and the Danish championship four times during his career. At his peak, he was considered to be one of the Nordic countries best basketball player.

== Playing career ==
Þorsteinn played his first game in 1959 with ÍR. He was a key player in the ÍR team that won the Icelandic championship for five straight seasons, from 1960 to 1964. In 1965, Þorsteinn joined SISU BK in the Danish Basketball League and helped the club to the national championship in 1966 and 1967. He left SISU midway through the 1967–68 season, with the club in first place, and rejoined ÍR.

Þorsteinn was named the Úrvalsdeild Player of the Year in 1971. After the season he moved back to Denmark and rejoined SISU, winning the Danish championship in 1972 and 1973.

Þorsteinn retired after winning the 1977 Icelandic championship with ÍR, but later appeared in three games during the 1979-1980 season before quitting for good.

== National basketball team ==
Þorsteinn, at the age of 16, played in the Iceland's first official national team game, against Denmark. Overall, Þorsteinn played 34 games for the Iceland's national basketball team from 1959 to 1975. He led all players in scoring during the 1964 Polar Cup and was considered one of the best Nordic players during that period.

== Team of the 20th century ==
In 2001 Þorsteinn was voted to the Icelandic team of the 20th century in basketball as a player.
