= ÍR (men's basketball) =

Íþróttafélag Reykjavíkur
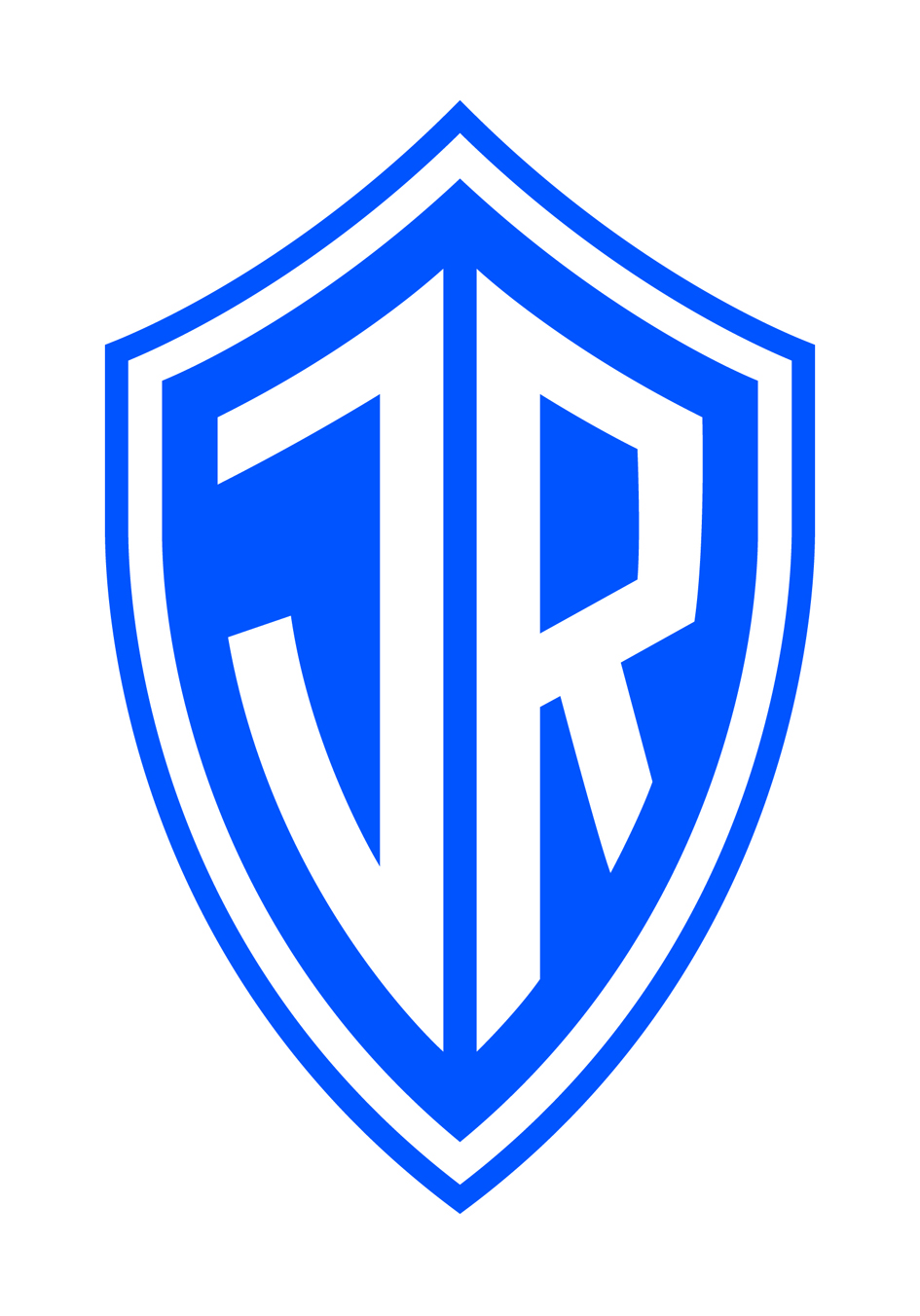
- Founded: 1950
- History: ÍR; 1950–present
- Arena: Hertz-Hellirinn
- Location: Reykjavík, Iceland
- Team colors: Blue, White
- Championships: 15 Úrvalsdeild karla
Home	Away

The Íþróttafélag Reykjavíkur men's basketball team, commonly known as ÍR, is the men's basketball department of Íþróttafélag Reykjavíkur. It is based in Reykjavík, Iceland and was one of the pioneers of basketball in Iceland and one of the founding members of the men's Úrvalsdeild. From 1954 to 1977, the team won fifteen national championships. In 1964, it became the first Icelandic team to compete in a continental competition when it defeated the Collegians from Belfast, 71-17, in the first round of the 1964–65 FIBA European Champions Cup (now called EuroLeague).

== History ==
ÍR's men's basketball department was founded in 1949 and its first chairman was Finnbjörn Þorvaldsson. From 1960 to 1965 the team won 47 games in a row in the national tournament and the Reykjavík Tournament.

=== Return to the playoffs: The Borce Ilievski era. ===
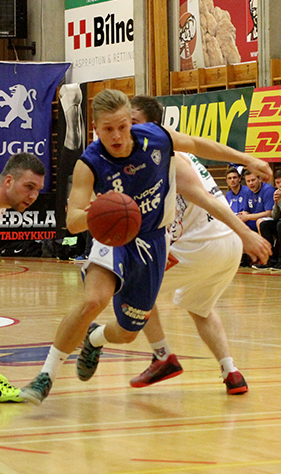
Matthías Orri Sigurðarson

In November 2015, ÍR fired Bjarni Magnússon after a bad start and replaced him with assistant coach Borce Ilievski. With Ilievski, the teams fortune did not change at first and the team finished 4-12 the rest of the way, finishing 10th and missing out of the playoffs. The following season, the team fared better and won 11 out of 22 games, good for a seventh place finish and a trip to the playoffs for the first time in six years. In the playoffs, ÍR lost to second seeded Stjarnan in three games.

Before the 2017–18 season, ÍR signed former Marshall University center, Ryan Taylor. Taylor's performances alongside point guard Matthías Orri Sigurðarson got ÍR into second place in the league after the regular season. In the playoffs ÍR faced seventh seeded Stjarnan in the first round. Following the third game of the series, which ÍR won, Taylor was suspended for three games for having hit Stjarnan's center Hlynur Bæringsson, in the back of the head. Despite this, ÍR won the series 3-1. Taylor missed the first two games of the second round series against eventual finalists Tindastóll. Tindastóll dispatched of ÍR in four games, 3-1.

Despite the heartbreaking loss in the previous year there was optimism in ÍR for the 2018–19 season. Taylor had left and was replaced by Americans Gerald Robinson and Justin Martin. The season did not go as well as the previous year. Martin was released from his contract in January, despite having had a 50 point game a couple weeks earlier. Former Westchester Knick, Kevin Capers, was signed to replace him.

ÍR scraped into the playoffs as a 7th seed and was due to face second seeded Njarðvík in the first round. ÍR lost the first game away from home as Capers was ejected for having slapped an opposing player in the head. Capers was suspended for the second game as ÍR found themselves in a 0-2 hole in a best of five series.

Capers returned in a away victory in game three. The victory sparked hope in the ÍR team which eventually came back and won the series 3-2 to set up a meeting with rivals and league champions Stjarnan. ÍR and Stjarnan had faced off in the Icelandic Cup semi-finals a few months earlier, won by Stjarnan but the game was most remembered for the fight that ensued between the teams supporter groups. Ghetto Hooligans and Silfurskeiðin.

Stjarnan totally obliterated ÍR in the first game in Ásgarður. Brandon Rozzell dominated the game and many counted ÍR out of the series after the first game. Things would not get so simple for Stjarnan as ÍR won two games in a row and was suddenly in position to defeat Stjarnan in game four at home. Stjarnan won in Seljaskóli to set up ÍR's second game five of the post-season.

The winner of the series would go on and face five-time champion powerhouse KR which had had a disappointing regular season and finished as the fifth seed. ÍR won game five and got into the finals for the first time since the playoff format was introduced in 1983.

In game one at KR the atmosphere was electric as Matthías Sigurðarson, formerly of KR, scored two free throws at the end of the fourth quarter to get into over time. In OT ÍR dominated and captain Sigurkarl Jóhannesson dunked as time expired as commentator Henry Gunnarsson yelled,: "The giant (KR) has been knocked out. The giant has been knocked out."

The star studded, title winning KR team took game two in Hertz-hellirinn in four quarters. In game three KR took control and lead for most of the game. ÍR's loud fanbase was silenced as shot after shot went down for KR, but a performance long remembered by the fans by Kevin Capers kept ÍR in the game and eventually secured another overtime in a dramatic fashion.

The tense situation continued in overtime and as the game was tied in the dying seconds KR thought they had stolen the ball and would have an opportunity to score the game winner. A foul was called which allowed ÍR the chance to win in DHL-höllin for the second time in a row, in overtime in the finals and take a 2-1 series lead against the five-time consecutive champions.

Kevin Capers waited as the shot clock ran down, made his move. Three seconds left and the ball was tossed to veteran forward Trausti Eiríksson who found 21-year old captain Sigurkarl Jóhannesson open in the corner. Jóhannesson's three hit the net as time expired and ÍR had the chance to win the championship at home in game four.

With the Íslandsmeistarabikar in a crowded Hertz-hellir for game four ÍR started strong and led by 15 in the third quarter but the experienced KR team found a way to get back and took game four and set up ÍR's third game five in three series. The loss was a heartbreak for ÍR but the bigger shock would come the day after. After having been fouled hard by Jón Arnór Stefánsson, former Dallas Maverick, KR-legend and widely regarded as the greatest Icelandic player ever, Kevin Capers had broken his hand and was out for the final game of the season, the title clincher.

Missing their best scorer ÍR faltered and after a first quarter shooting clinic by KR point guard Mike DiNunno and KR eventually won their sixth title in a row.

On 22 October, the Borce Ilievski era came to an end when he resigned from ÍR following a 0–3 start to the 2021–22 season.

== Arena ==
ÍR plays its home games at the TM-Hellirinn.

== European record ==
Season	Competition	Round	Opponent	Home	Away	Aggregate
1964–65	FIBA European Champions Cup	1Q	(Republic of Ireland) Collegians	71–17	63–47	134–64
1964–65	FIBA European Champions Cup	2Q	(France) ASVEL	42–74	18–84	61–158
1972–73	FIBA European Champions Cup	1Q	(Spain) Real Madrid	67–117	37–93	102-210

In September 1975 ÍR was drawn from a pool of teams to face Real Madrid in the 1975–76 FIBA European Champions Cup. While they were eligible as the national champions to do so, the team never intended to participate in the tournament due to high costs involved and thus didn't register for it nor pay the participation fees. A letter by the Icelandic Basketball Association which informed FIBA on which Icelandic teams where eligible to participate in official FIBA tournaments was mistakenly taken as a confirmation of their participation. Due to the mistake, Real Madrid went through with a walkover.

== Trophies and awards ==
=== Trophies ===
- Úrvalsdeild karla: (15)
  - 1954, 1955, 1957, 1960, 1961, 1962, 1963, 1964, 1969, 1970, 1971, 1972, 1973, 1975, 1977
- Icelandic Basketball Cup: (2)
  - 2001, 2007
- Division I: (2)
  - 1987, 2000

=== Awards ===
Úrvalsdeild Men's Domestic Player of the Year

- Birgir Jakobsson – 1972
- Herbert Arnarson – 1995
- Kristinn Jörundsson – 1975, 1977
- Pétur Guðmundsson – 1983
- Þorsteinn Hallgrímsson – 1969, 1971

Úrvalsdeild Men's Domestic All-First Team

- Eiríkur Önundarson – 2001, 2003
- Herbert Arnarson – 1995, 1996
- Hreggviður Magnússon – 2008
- Matthías Orri Sigurðarson – 2017, 2019
- Sigurður Þorsteinsson – 2019
- Sveinbjörn Claessen – 2008

Úrvalsdeild Men's Young Player of the Year

- Herbert Arnarson – 1995

Úrvalsdeild Men's Coach of the Year

- Borce Ilievski – 2019

== Notable players ==
Note: Flags indicate national team eligibility at FIBA-sanctioned events. Players may hold other non-FIBA nationalities not displayed.

Criteria

To appear in this section a player must have either:

- Set a club record or won an individual award while at the club
- Played at least one official international match for their national team at any time
- Played at least one official NBA match at any time.

- (Iceland) Agnar Friðriksson
- (Iceland) Anton Bjarnason
- (Iceland) Benedikt Ingþórsson
- (Iceland) Birgir Jakobsson
- (Iceland) Björn Ottó Steffensen
- (Iceland) Bragi Reynisson
- (Iceland) Brynjar Karl Sigurðsson
- (Iceland) Collin Pryor
- (Iceland) Danero Thomas
- (Iceland) Eggert Garðarsson
- (Iceland) Einar Bollason
- (Iceland) Eiríkur Önundarson
- (Iceland) Erlendur Markússon
- (Iceland) Erró
- (United States) Frank Booker
- (Iceland) Guðmundur Þorsteinsson
- (Iceland) Gylfi Þorkelsson
- (Iceland) Haukur Hannesson
- (Iceland) Herbert Arnarson
- (Iceland) Hjörtur Oddsson
- (Iceland) Hólmsteinn Sigurðsson
- (Iceland) Hreggviður Magnússon
- (Iceland) Hreinn Þorkelsson
- (Iceland) Ívar DeCarsta Webster
- (United States) John Rhodes
- (Iceland) Jóhannes Karl Sveinsson
- (Iceland) Jón Jónasson
- (Iceland) Jón Jörundsson
- (Canada) Keith Vassell
- (Iceland) Kolbeinn Kristinsson
- (Iceland) Kristinn Jörundsson
- (Estonia) Martin Paasoja
- (Iceland) Matthías Orri Sigurðarson
- (Iceland) Pétur Guðmundsson
- (Scotland) Paul Stewart
- (Iceland) Pavel Ermolinskij
- (Iceland) Ragnar Torfason
- (Switzerland) Roberto Kovac
- (Iceland) Sigurður E. Gíslason
- (Iceland) Sigurður P. Gíslason
- (Iceland) Sigurður Þorvaldsson
- (Iceland) Skúli Jóhannsson
- (Iceland) Sveinbjörn Claessen
- (Iceland) Trausti Stefánsson
- (Iceland) Þorsteinn Hallgrímsson

== Coaches ==
- (Iceland) Evald Mikson (1950–1952)
- (Iceland) Helgi Jóhannsson (1952–?)
- (Iceland) Einar Ólafsson (?–1976)
- (Iceland) Þorsteinn Hallgrímsson (1976–1977)
- (Scotland) Paul Stewart (1978–1979)
- (Iceland) Einar Ólafsson (1979–1980)
- (Iceland) Einar Bollason (1986–1988)
- (Iceland) Sturla Örlygsson (1988–1989)
- (United States) Thomas Lee (1989–1990)
- (Iceland) Jón Jörundsson (1990–1991)
- (United States) John Rhodes (1994–1996)
- (Canada) Antonio Vallejo (1996–1998)
- (Iceland) Karl Jónsson (1998)
- (Iceland) Jón Örn Guðmundsson (2000–2002)
- (Iceland) Eggert Garðarsson (2002–2003)
- (Iceland) Eggert Maríuson (2003–2005)
- (Iceland) Jón Örn Guðmundsson and (Iceland) Halldór Kristmannsson (2005–2006)
- (Iceland) Bárður Eyþórsson (2006)
- (Iceland) Jón Örn Guðmundsson and (Iceland) Halldór Kristmannsson (2006)
- (Iceland) Jón Arnar Ingvarsson (2006–2009)
- (Iceland) Gunnar Sverrison (2010–2012)
- (Iceland) Jón Arnar Ingvarsson (2012–2013)
- (Iceland) Örvar Kristjánsson (2013–2014)
- (Iceland) Bjarni Magnússon (2014–2015)
- (North Macedonia) Borce Ilievski (2015–2021)
- (Iceland) Ísak Máni Wíum and (Iceland) Sveinbjörn Claessen (2021)
- (Iceland) Friðrik Ingi Rúnarsson (2021–2022)
- (Iceland) Ísak Máni Wíum (2022–2024)
- (Iceland) Baldur Már Stefánsson (interim, 2024)
- (North Macedonia) Borce Ilievski (2024–present)

== Reserve team ==
In 2019, ÍR-b lost to Breiðablik in the 3. deild karla finals. It nonetheless achieved promotion to the 2. deild karla.

=== Titles ===
Division III

- Runner-up: 2019
