= Herbert Arnarson =

Icelandic basketball player

Personal information
- Born: May 4, 1970 (age 56) Reykjavík, Iceland
- Listed height: 1.95 m (6 ft 5 in)

Career information
- High school: Madisonville
- College: Kentucky Wesleyan (1989–1994)
- Playing career: 1985–2003
- Position: Guard

Career history

Playing
- 1985-1986: ÍR
- 1994–1996: ÍR
- 1996–1997: Donar Groningen
- 1997–1998: Racing Antwerpen
- 1998–1999: Grindavík
- 1999–2000: Donar Groningen
- 2000–2001: Valur/Fjölnir
- 2001–2003: KR

Coaching
- 2003–2004: KR (assistant)
- 2004–2006: KR
- 2013: ÍR

Career highlights
- Icelandic Men's Basketball Player of the Year (1999); 3x Úrvalsdeild Domestic All-First team (1995, 1996, 1999); Úrvalsdeild Domestic Player of the Year (1995); Úrvalsdeild Young Player of the Year (1995); NCAA Division II champion (1990); Icelandic Supercup (1998)
Medals
Men's basketball
Representing Iceland
Games of the Small States of Europe
| Gold medal – first place | 1993 Malta | Team |

Herbert Svavar Arnarson (born May 4, 1970) is an Icelandic former basketball player and a former member of Icelandic national team. In 1995, he was the second player to be named both the Úrvalsdeild karla Domestic Player of the Year and the Young Player of the Year in the same season. In 1998 he helped Racing Antwerpen to the Belgian Basketball League finals where it lost to Spirou Charleroi.

== College ==
After playing for Madisonville High School, Herbert joined Kentucky Wesleyan College where he became NCAA Division II champion in 1990.

== Icelandic national team ==
From 1991 to 2002, Herbert played 111 games for the Icelandic national team.

== Awards and accomplishments ==
=== Titles ===
- NCAA Division II: 1990
- Icelandic Supercup: 1998

=== Individual awards ===
- Icelandic Men's Basketball Player of the Year: 2000
- Úrvalsdeild Domestic All-First team (3): 1995, 1996, 1999
- Úrvalsdeild Domestic Player of the Year: 1995
- Úrvalsdeild Young Player of the Year: 1995
