= Jón Arnar Ingvarsson =

Icelandic basketball player and coach (b. 1972)

Personal information
- Born: 3 June 1972 (age 54) Iceland

Career information
- Playing career: 1988–2004
- Position: Point guard
- Coaching career: 1998–2013

Career history

Playing
- 1988–1998: Haukar
- 1998: Castors Braine
- 1998–2002: Haukar
- 2002–2004: Breiðablik

Coaching
- 1998–1999: Haukar
- 2002–2005: Breiðablik
- 2006–2009: ÍR
- 2012–2013: ÍR

Career highlights
- As player: Úrvalsdeild Domestic All-First team (1996); Úrvalsdeild Young Player of the Year (1989); Icelandic Cup (1996); Úrvalsdeild karla assist leader (1996); As coach: Icelandic Cup (2007)

Career Úrvalsdeild karla playing statistics
- Points: 4,679 (13.8 ppg)
- Rebounds: 1,392 (4.1 rpg)
- Assists: 1,396 (4.1 apg)

Career coaching record
- Úrvalsdeild karla: 52–89 (.369)
Medals
Men's basketball
Representing Iceland
Promotion Cup
Gold medal – first place	1990 Wales	Team
Bronze medal – third place	1994 Ireland	Team
Games of the Small States of Europe
Gold medal – first place	1991 Andorra	Team
Gold medal – first place	1993 Malta	Team
Bronze medal – third place	1995 Luxembourg	Team
Bronze medal – third place	1997 Iceland	Team

Jón Arnar Ingvarsson (born 3 June 1972) is an Icelandic former professional basketball player and coach. He spent the majority of his career with Haukar in the Úrvalsdeild karla. He retired as the Úrvalsdeild all-time leader in assists but has since been surpassed by Justin Shouse.

== Playing career ==
=== Club career ===
Jón Arnar started his senior career in 1988, at the age of 16, with Haukar, where he spent the first 10 years of his career, winning the Icelandic Cup with the club in 1996. The same year he led the Úrvalsdeild in assists and was named to the Úrvalsdeild Domestic All-First team. In January 1998, he left the club and signed with Castors Braine in Belgium. He returned to Haukar the next season and stayed there until 2002, when he took over Breiðablik as player-coach. He retired as player in 2004.

=== National team career ===
Jón Arnar played 102 games for the Icelandic national team from 1990 to 2000.

== Coaching career ==
Jón Arnar was hired as the head coach of Haukar in November 1998, replacing recently fired Einar Einarsson. He coached the team for the rest of the season, accumulating a 4-10 record.

He took over as the head coach of Breiðablik in 2002. After two seasons in the Úrvalsdeild, the club was relegated to 1. deild karla in 2004. After a disappointing start of the 2005–2006 season, the board of Breiðablik fired Jón Arnar in December 2005.

Jón Arnar was hired as the head coach of ÍR in 2006 and led them to victory in the Icelandic Cup in his first season. In December 2009, he stepped down as the head coach due to his wife's illness. He returned to ÍR in April 2012 when he signed a 2-year contract with the club. He stepped down as the head coach of the club on 1 February 2013 after a disappointing tenure with the team in last place.

== Personal life ==
Jón Arnar is the son of Ingvar Jónsson, a former player and coach for Haukar. His brother, Pétur Ingvarsson, played 26 games for the national team. Jón Arnar's son is Kári Jónsson, a professional basketball player.
