= 2018–19 Úrvalsdeild karla (basketball) =

Domino's deild karla^{1}
- Duration: 4 October 2018 – 4 May 2019
- Games played: 132
- Teams: 12
- TV partner: Stöð 2 Sport

Regular season
- Top seed: Stjarnan
- Relegated: Skallagrímur, Breiðablik

Finals
- Champions: KR (18th title)
- Runners-up: ÍR
- Semi-finalists: Stjarnan, Þór Þorlákshöfn
- Finals MVP: (United States) Julian Boyd

Awards
- Domestic MVP: (Iceland) Kristófer Acox
- Foreign MVP: (United States) Julian Boyd

Statistical leaders
Points	(United States) Brandon Rozzell	24.3
Rebounds	(United States) Kinu Rochford	12.2
Assists	(Croatia) Nikolas Tomsick (Iceland) Ægir Steinarsson	7.5

Records
- Biggest home win: Tindastóll 92–51 ÍR (22 November 2018)
- Biggest away win: Keflavík 97–62 Grindavík (18 October 2018); Tindastóll 117–82 Breiðablik (10 December 2018)
- Highest scoring: Þór Þ. 132–93 Breiðablik (7 February 2019)
- Winning streak: 11 games Stjarnan
- Losing streak: 17 games Breiðablik
- All statistics correct as of 14 March 2019.^{1} Sponsored league name, referring to Úrvalsdeild karla.

The 2018–19 Úrvalsdeild karla was the 68th season of the Úrvalsdeild karla, the top tier men's basketball league in Iceland. The season started on 4 October 2018 and ended on 4 May 2019. KR won its sixth title in a row by defeating ÍR 3–2 in the Finals.

== Competition format ==
The participating teams first played a conventional round-robin schedule with every team playing each opponent once home and once away for a total of 22 games. The top eight teams qualified for the championship playoffs whilst the two last qualified were relegated to Division 1.

== Teams ==
Location of teams in 2018–19 Premier League
Clubs in Reykjavík: ÍR, KR, Valur

Team	City, Region	Arena	Head coach
Breiðablik	Kópavogur	Smárinn	(Iceland) Pétur Ingvarsson
Grindavík	Grindavík	Mustad Höllin	(Iceland) Jóhann Þór Ólafsson
Haukar	Hafnarfjörður	Schenkerhöllin	(Iceland) Ívar Ásgrímsson
ÍR	Reykjavík	Hertz Hellirinn	(North Macedonia) Borce Ilievski
Keflavík	Keflavík	TM Höllin	(Iceland) Sverrir Þór Sverrisson
KR	Reykjavík	DHL Höllin	(Iceland) Ingi Þór Steinþórsson
Njarðvík	Njarðvík	green/white	(Iceland) Einar Árni Jóhannsson
Skallagrímur	Borgarnes	Fjósið	(Iceland) Finnur Jónsson
Stjarnan	Garðabær	Ásgarður	(Iceland) Arnar Guðjónsson
Tindastóll	Sauðárkrókur	Sauðárkrókur	(Spain) Israel Martín
Valur	Reykjavík	Origo-höllin	(Iceland) Ágúst Björgvinsson
Þór Þorlákshöfn	Þorlákshöfn	Icelandic Glacial Höllin	(Iceland) Baldur Þór Ragnarsson

=== Managerial changes ===
Team	Outgoing manager	Manner of departure	Date of vacancy	Position in table	Replaced with	Date of appointment
Njarðvík	(Iceland) Daníel Guðmundsson	End of contract	24 March 2018	Off-season	(Iceland) Einar Árni Jóhannsson	25 March 2018
Stjarnan	(Iceland) Hrafn Kristjánsson	End of contract	27 March 2018	Off-season	(Iceland) Arnar Guðjónsson	6 April 2018
Keflavík	(Iceland) Friðrik Ingi Rúnarsson	Retired	28 March 2018	Off-season	(Iceland) Sverrir Þór Sverrisson	5 April 2018
Breiðablik	(United States) Chris Woods	End of contract	18 April 2018	Off-season	(Iceland) Pétur Ingvarsson	18 April 2018
KR	(Iceland) Finnur Freyr Stefánsson	End of contract	5 June 2018	Off-season	(Iceland) Ingi Þór Steinþórsson	12 June 2018

== Regular season ==
=== League table ===
Pos	Team	Pld	W	L	PF	PA	PD	Pts	Qualification or relegation
1	Stjarnan	22	17	5	2034	1755	+279	34	Qualification to playoffs
2	Njarðvík	22	17	5	1967	1810	+157	34	Qualification to playoffs
3	Tindastóll	22	16	6	1910	1705	+205	32	Qualification to playoffs
4	Keflavík	22	15	7	1936	1790	+146	30	Qualification to playoffs
5	KR	22	15	7	1917	1837	+80	30	Qualification to playoffs
6	Þór Þorl	22	12	10	2021	1942	+79	24	Qualification to playoffs
7	ÍR	22	10	12	1875	1950	−75	20	Qualification to playoffs
8	Grindavík	22	9	13	1908	1988	−80	18	Qualification to playoffs
9	Valur	22	8	14	1989	2061	−72	16	
10	Haukar	22	8	14	1803	1948	−145	16	
11	Skallagrímur	22	4	18	1846	2056	−210	8	Relegated to Division 1
12	Breiðablik	22	1	21	1873	2237	−364	2	Relegated to Division 1

Source: KKÍ

=== Results ===
Home \ Away	BRE	GRI	HAU	IR	KEF	KR	NJA	SKA	STJ	TIN	VAL	THO
Breiðablik	—	103–104	93–105	68–99	86–108	76–99	70–102	93–83	87–102	82–117	69–93	107–110
Grindavík	95–86	—	111–102	81–85	62–97	94–103	79–90	90–83	92–99	100–96	90–88	82–95
Haukar	96–92	73–83	—	66–84	81–64	83–74	85–72	82–80	76–107	73–66	92–102	73–106
ÍR	92–82	76–101	92–74	—	74–94	72–80	88–94	96–95	83–106	85–90	118–100	95–96
Keflavík	88–80	88–77	80–65	102–70	—	85–79	85–88	104–82	68–66	78–92	101–77	91–75
KR	103–68	85–95	97–88	71–69	80–76	—	55–71	109–93	88–87	93–86	96–89	86–85
Njarðvík	108–103	94–63	99–89	95–98	97–90	85–67	—	113–84	99–95	75–76	85–80	82–76
Skallagrímur	91–90	93–88	80–79	99–96	95–97	78–94	82–89	—	80–94	82–90	96–105	74–89
Stjarnan	102–73	91–73	100–89	94–77	99–83	95–84	82–76	82–72	—	68–77	107–71	89–73
Tindastóll	94–70	71–70	79–61	92–51	89–68	88–91	95–73	89–73	58–79	—	97–94	84–68
Valur	114–102	100–96	88–95	82–83	77–86	79–95	86–90	100–77	97–92	73–93	—	96–87
Þór Þorl	132–93	90–80	99–76	88–92	99–103	95–88	80–90	87–74	79–98	98–90	114–98	—

Source: Icelandic Basketball Federation
Legend: Blue = home team win; Red = away team win.

== Playoffs ==
The playoffs are played between the eight first qualified teams with a 1-1-1-1-1 format, playing seeded teams games 1, 3 and 5 at home.

=== Bracket ===
Quarterfinals
1	Stjarnan	3
8	Grindavík	1
4	Keflavík	0
5	KR	3
(Pairings are reseeded after the first round)
2	Njarðvík	2
7	ÍR	3
3	Tindastóll	2
6	Þór Þorl	3

Semifinals
1	Stjarnan	2
7	ÍR	3
5	KR	3
6	Þór Þorl	1

Finals
7	ÍR	2
5	KR	3

=== Quarterfinals ===
Team 1	Series	Team 2	Game 1	Game 2	Game 3	Game 4	Game 5
Stjarnan	3–1	Grindavík	89–80	84–82	98–81	83–76	
Njarðvík	2–3	ÍR	76–71	85–70	64–70	79–87	74–86
Tindastóll	2–3	Þór Þorl	112–105	87–73	67–87	83–92	93–94
Keflavík	0–3	KR	76–77	77–86	64–85		

=== Semifinals ===
Team 1	Series	Team 2	Game 1	Game 2	Game 3	Game 4	Game 5
Stjarnan	2–3	ÍR	96–63	76–85	62–68	90–75	79–83
KR	3–1	Þór Þorl	99–91	90–102	98–89	108–93	

=== Finals ===
Team 1	Series	Team 2	Game 1	Game 2	Game 3	Game 4	Game 5
KR	3–2	ÍR	83–89	86–73	86–89	80–75	98–70

== Notable occurrences ==
- On April 20, Dagur Kár Jónsson exercised an escape clause in his contract and left Grindavík to sign back with his hometown club of Stjarnan, much to the dismay of Grindavík's board as they claimed that he had stated to them that he would stay at the club for next season.
- On April 28, Valur signed former Njarðvík player and long time Icelandic national team member Ragnar Nathanaelsson.
- On May 8, Tindastóll signed ÍR key player Danero Thomas.
- On May 23, Njarðvík signed Jeb Ivey who helped the club to a championship in 2006.
- On June 8, KR's all-time leading scorer, Brynjar Þór Björnsson, left the club and signed with rivals Tindastóll.
- On June 27, it was reported that Njarðvík had signed former Höttur and Haukar player Gerald Robinson.
- On July 3, it was reported that Sigtryggur Arnar Björnsson wanted to leave Tindastóll and join Grindavík, and that he considered his contract with the club not valid as the club did not send it to the Icelandic Basketball Federation within 30 days from its signing as the federations rules stipulated. The chairman of Tindastól in turn said that they viewed the contract as valid and that they expected Sigtryggur to report to the team for training camp before the season. The next day the clubs reported that they had reached an agreement and Sigtryggur signed with Grindavík later that day.
- On July 17, Stjarnan signed Icelandic national team member Ægir Steinarsson after he rejecting an offer from KR.
- On July 18, KR signed point guard and Haukar long time captain, Emil Barja.
- On July 19, KR signed small forward Julian Boyd who had previously played for London Lightning of the National Basketball League of Canada.
- On July 25, recently signed Dagur Kár Jónsson left Stjarnan and signed with Raiffeisen Flyers Wels of the Österreichische Basketball Bundesliga. It was the second time during the off-season that he had used an escape clause in his contract to sign with a new team.
- On August 15, it was reported that Tindastóll signed two-time Basketligan champion Dino Butorac.
- On August 16, Stjarnan signed Finnish national team member Antti Kanervo.
- On August 17, ÍR signed national team member Sigurður Þorsteinsson who played for Grindavík during the 2017–18 season.
- On August 23, it was reported that Stjarnan had signed Paul Jones who played the previous season with Haukar, helping them to the best record in the league.
- On September 11, Keflavík signed former BC Palanga player Mantas Mockevičius.
- On September 12, Valur signed Bulgarian national team member Aleks Simeonov.
- On September 17, long-time Stjarnan player Marvin Valdimarsson announced that he was leaving the team and joining 2. deild karla club Ungmennafélag Álftaness.
- On September 15, it was reported that Þór Þorlákshöfn had signed Kinu Rochford.
- On September 27, Njarðvík released Gerald Robinson.
- On October 5, ÍR signed Gerald Robinson who was released by Njarðvík the previous week.
- On October 13, Grindavík signed Lewis Clinch instead of Terrell Vinston who tore his left ACL two days earlier. Vinston would later heavily criticize Grindavík for how it handled his injury.
- On October 25, KR's chairman Böðvar Guðjónsson confirmed that Pavel Ermolinskij had resumed training with the team after sitting out the first three games of the season.
- On November 15, Njarðvík signed national team member Elvar Már Friðriksson who had recently been released by Denain Voltaire Basket after a roster overhaul.
- On November 15, KR signed back reigning Úrvalsdeild Domestic Player of the Year, Kristófer Acox, after he reached an agreement with Denain Voltaire Basket to be released from his contract with the club.
- On November 19, it was reported that Valur starting guard, Oddur Rúnar Kristjánsson, had failed a drug test and was likely facing a 4-year suspension.
- On December 9, Tindastóll's guard Brynjar Þór Björnsson set the Úrvalsdeild record for most three-pointers made in a game when he made 16 of 31 three-point shots, on his way to 48 points, in a victory against Breiðablik, breaking Frank Booker's 27-year-old record.
- On December 18, it was reported that Haukar had released starting center Marquese Oliver who had been averaging 19.9 points and 11.6 rebounds per game.
- On December 19, it was reported that Stjarnan had released Paul Jones after a disappointing start for the club, who were predicted as the favorites to win the national championship prior to the season. In 10 games for Stjarnan, he was the team's leading scorer with 20.2 points per game while also averaging 7.1 rebounds and shooting 40.0% from the three-point range.
- On December 21, Keflavík announced it had signed former BC Neptūnas player Mindaugas Kačinas.
- On December 23, it was reported that Stjarnan had signed former Basketligaen Most Valuable Player Brandon Rozzell for the rest of the season.
- On January 3, Breiðablik announced it had signed Jameel McKay and Kofi Josephs to replace Christian Covile and Jure Gunjina.
- On January 3, Tindastóll signed Axel Kárason for the rest of the season.
- On January 6, Valur announced that BCM Gravelines-Dunkerque of the French LNB Pro A had bought up the contract of Kendall Anthony. At the time of his departure, Anthony was averaging 31.5 points, 8.8 assists in 8 games, while shooting 64.1% from three-point range and 94.0% from the free throw line, leading the league in each category. In his place, Valur signed Dominique Rambo.
- On January 10, Breiðablik coach Pétur Ingvarsson revealed that starting center Snorri Hrafnkelsson would miss the rest of the season due to a concussion, his third in his career.
- On January 17, it was reported that Stjarnan had signed Austrian national team member Filip Kramer.
- On January 19, it was reported that Ingvi Þór Guðmundsson was returning to Grindavík after spending the first half of the season with Saint Louis University.
- On January 25, Tindastóll announced it had signed Michael Ojo for the rest of the season.
- On February 1, Njarðvík announced that it had released Julijan Rajic and signed French center Eric Katenda in his place.
- On 20 March, the head coach of Keflavík, Sverrir Þór Sverrisson, stated that fan favorite Mantas Mockevičius was AWOL from the team and would therefore not play for it again this season.
- On 23 March, ÍR's Kevin Capers was suspended for game 2 of ÍR's first round series against Njarðvík in the Úrvalsdeild playoffs for striking Jón Arnór Sverrisson in the head in game one.
- On 1 April, following Njarðvík's first round loss to ÍR, Jeb Ivey announced his retirement from professional basketball.
