= 2020–21 Úrvalsdeild karla (basketball) =

Domino's deild karla^{1}
- Duration: 1 October 2020 – 25 June 2021
- Games played: 161
- Teams: 12
- TV partner: Stöð 2 Sport

Regular season
- Top seed: Keflavík
- Relegated: Höttur; Haukar

Finals
- Champions: Þór Þorlákshöfn
- Runners-up: Keflavík
- Semi-finalists: KR
- Finals MVP: (Lithuania) Adomas Drungilas

Awards
- Domestic MVP: (Iceland) Hörður Vilhjálmsson
- Foreign MVP: (United Kingdom) Deane Williams

Statistical leaders
Points	(United States) Shawn Glover	26.2
Rebounds	(United States) Antonio Hester	12.0
Assists	(Iceland) Hörður Vilhjálmsson	9.5

Records
- Biggest home win: Tindastóll 117–65 Þór Akureyri (22 April 2021)
- Biggest away win: Keflavík 115–82 Grindavík (22 March 2021)
- Highest scoring: Grindavík 105–101 Þór Akureyri (11 March 2021)
- Winning streak: 12; Keflavík
- Losing streak: 6 Haukar; Höttur; Njarðvík
- All statistics correct as of 10 May 2021.^{1} Sponsored league name, referring to Úrvalsdeild karla.

The 2020–21 Úrvalsdeild karla was the 70th season of the Úrvalsdeild karla, the top tier men's basketball league in Iceland. The season started on 1 October 2020 and ended on 25 June 2021. Þór Þorlákshöfn won its first title by defeating Keflavík 3–1 in the Finals.

== Competition format ==
The participating teams first played a conventional round-robin schedule with every team playing each opponent once home and once away for a total of 22 games. The top eight teams qualified for the championship playoffs whilst the two last qualified were relegated to Division 1.

== Teams ==
Team	City, Region	Arena	Head coach
Grindavík	Grindavík	Mustad Höllin	(Iceland) Daníel Guðni Guðmundsson
Haukar	Hafnarfjörður	Schenkerhöllin	(Iceland) Sævaldur Bjarnason
Höttur	Egilsstaðir	Dalhús	(Iceland) Viðar Örn Hafsteinsson
ÍR	Reykjavík	Hertz Hellirinn	(North Macedonia) Borce Ilievski
Keflavík	Keflavík	TM Höllin	(Iceland) Hjalti Þór Vilhjálmsson
KR	Reykjavík	DHL Höllin	(Iceland) Darri Freyr Atlason
Njarðvík	Njarðvík	Ljónagryfjan	(Iceland) Einar Árni Jóhannsson
Stjarnan	Garðabær	Ásgarður	(Iceland) Arnar Guðjónsson
Tindastóll	Sauðárkrókur	Sauðárkrókur	(Iceland) Baldur Þór Ragnarsson
Valur	Reykjavík	Origo-höllin	(Iceland) Finnur Freyr Stefánsson
Þór Akureyri	Akureyri	Höllin	(Iceland) Bjarki Ármann Oddsson
Þór Þorlákshöfn	Þorlákshöfn	Icelandic Glacial Höllin	(Iceland) Lárus Jónsson

=== Managerial changes ===
Team	Outgoing manager	Manner of departure	Date of vacancy	Position in table	Replaced with	Date of appointment
Þór Akureyri	(Iceland) Lárus Jónsson	Resigned	14 April 2020	Off-season	(United States) Andrew Johnson	1 August 2020
Þór Þorlákshöfn	(Iceland) Friðrik Ingi Rúnarsson	Resigned	27 March 2020	Off-season	(Iceland) Lárus Jónsson	15 April 2020
KR	(Iceland) Ingi Þór Steinþórsson	Fired	7 May 2020	Off-season	(Iceland) Darri Freyr Atlason	25 May 2020
Þór Akureyri	(United States) Andrew Johnston	Fired	19 October 2020	7-12th	(Iceland) Bjarki Ármann Oddsson	23 October 2020
Haukar	(Spain) Israel Martín	Fired	16 March 2021	12th	(Iceland) Sævaldur Bjarnason	17 March 2021

== Regular season ==
=== Standings ===
Pos	Team	Pld	W	L	PF	PA	PD	Pts	Qualification or relegation
1	Keflavík	22	20	2	2065	1750	+315	40	Qualification to playoffs
2	Þór Þorlákshöfn	22	14	8	2126	1990	+136	28	Qualification to playoffs
3	Stjarnan	22	14	8	2015	1936	+79	28	Qualification to playoffs
4	Valur	22	12	10	1885	1863	+22	24	Qualification to playoffs
5	KR	22	12	10	1975	1985	−10	24	Qualification to playoffs
6	Grindavík	22	11	11	1924	1991	−67	22	Qualification to playoffs
7	Þór Akureyri	22	10	12	1929	2056	−127	20	Qualification to playoffs
8	Tindastóll	22	9	13	1979	1995	−16	18	Qualification to playoffs
9	Njarðvík	22	9	13	1836	1866	−30	18	
10	ÍR	22	8	14	1998	2051	−53	16	
11	Höttur	22	7	15	1898	2018	−120	14	Relegated to Division 1
12	Haukar	22	6	16	1855	1984	−129	12	Relegated to Division 1

Updated to match(es) played on 10 May 2021. Source: KKÍ

=== Results ===
Home \ Away	GRI	HAU	HOT	IR	KEF	KR	NJA	STJ	TIN	VAL	THA	THO
Grindavík	—	82–75	89–96	79–76	76–81	83–95	91–94	93–89	93–83	97–85	119–105	105–101
Haukar	76–81	—	100–104	93–91	76–83	87–103	82–71	86–92	93–91	85–78	79–100	100–116
Höttur	94–101	90–84	—	87–105	62–74	97–98	88–83	93–94	86–103	91–95	95–70	85–100
ÍR	98–76	97–83	89–69	—	109–116	84–91	99–106	97–95	91–69	90–96	105–90	98–105
Keflavík	94–67	86–74	93–73	86–79	—	95–87	89–57	100–81	107–81	101–82	102–69	115–87
KR	83–85	69–72	113–108	112–101	74–98	—	80–92	100–91	101–104	77–87	86–90	77–107
Njarðvík	81–78	85–87	72–74	96–80	77–90	77–81	—	88–96	74–77	78–80	97–75	88–73
Stjarnan	79–74	88–76	97–70	95–87	115–75	85–96	82–70	—	98–93	90–79	86–91	100–111
Tindastóll	88–81	86–73	90–82	83–87	71–86	99–104	107–108	96–102	—	71–77	117–65	92–91
Valur	91–76	87–79	88–81	101–90	85–72	71–80	76–85	86–91	90–79	—	99–68	67–86
Þór Akureyri	101–98	96–87	83–84	107–84	74–94	88–92	90–68	83–86	103–95	98–89	—	75–91
Þór Þorlákshöfn	92–94	105–97	97–89	105–58	88–94	84–76	91–89	92–83	103–104	98–96	103–108	—

Updated to match(es) played on 8 May 2021. Source: KKÍ
Legend: Blue = home team win; Red = away team win.

== Playoffs ==
The playoffs are played between the eight first qualified teams with a 1-1-1-1-1 format, playing seeded teams games 1, 3 and 5 at home.

=== Bracket ===
Quarterfinals
1	Keflavík	3
8	Tindastóll	0
4	Valur	2
5	KR	3
(Pairings are reseeded after the first round)
2	Þór Þorlákshöfn	3
7	Þór Akureyri	1
3	Stjarnan	3
6	Grindavík	2

Semifinals
1	Keflavík	3
5	KR	0
2	Þór Þorlákshöfn	3
3	Stjarnan	2

Finals
1	Keflavík	1
2	Þór Þorlákshöfn	3

=== Quarterfinals ===
Team 1	Series	Team 2	Game 1	Game 2	Game 3	Game 4	Game 5
Keflavík	3–0	Tindastóll	79–71	86–74	87–83		
Valur	2–3	KR	98–99	85–84	103–115	88–82	86-89
Þór Þorlákshöfn	3–1	Þór Akureyri	95–76	79–93	109–104	98–66	
Stjarnan	3–2	Grindavík	90–72	89–101	85–69	92–95	104–72

=== Semifinals ===
Team 1	Series	Team 2	Game 1	Game 2	Game 3	Game 4	Game 5
Keflavík	3–0	KR	89–81	91–82	88–70		
Þór Þorlákshöfn	2–1	Stjarnan	90–99	94–90	115–92	58–78	92–74

=== Finals ===
Team 1	Series	Team 2	Game 1	Game 2	Game 3	Game 4	Game 5
Keflavík	1–3	Þór Þorlákshöfn	73–91	83–88	97–83	66–81	

== Notable occurrences ==
- On 14 April, Nikolas Tomsick signed with Tindastóll, meeting his former Þór Þorlákshöfn coach Baldur Þór Ragnarsson.
- On 16 April, it was reported that ÍR had terminated its contract with national team center Sigurður Þorsteinsson and was involved in a salary dispute with him. In August 2020, Sigurður sued ÍR for missing salary payments and claimed the team owed him over 2 million ISK. ÍR had stopped paying Sigurður his salary after the injury, claiming he was not fulfilling his end of the contract. On 17 November 2020, the District Court of Reykjavík ruled that ÍR owed Sigurður two million ISK in back pays plus penalties.
- On 16 April, ÍR signed three-time 1. deild karla scoring leader Everage Richardson.
- On 7 May, Valur announced it had released Ragnar Nathanaelsson and Austin Magnús Bracey.
- On 12 May, Þór Akureyri signed Srdjan Stojanovic from Fjölnir. Stojanovic was the 8th leading scorer in the league the previous season.
- On 17 May, Grindavík signed Iceland national team member Kristinn Pálsson from Njarðvík.
- On 18 May, Stjarnan announced it had added Danielle Rodriguez and Ingi Þór Steinþórsson as assistant coaches to Arnar Guðjónsson. Rodriguez had spent the previous four seasons playing in the Úrvalsdeild kvenna while Ingi Þór had spent the last two seasons as the head coach of reigning Úrvalsdeild karla champions KR.
- On 1 June, Haukar signed national team player Ragnar Nathanaelsson who had played the previous two seasons with Valur.
- On 5 June, it was reported that Njarðvík had signed American-British player Rodney Glasgow Jr.
- On 10 June, Iceland national team member Sigurður Þorsteinsson signed with Höttur.
- On 16 June, ÍR hired Kristjana Eir Jónsdóttir as an assistant coach, making her the second female coach in the league behind Stjarnan's Danielle Rodriguez.
- On 30 June, Mirza Sarajlija signed with Stjarnan, filling the spot left by Nikolas Tomsick.
- On 29 July, Tindastóll signed Shawn Glover.
- On 5 August, former Icelandic Sportsperson of the Year and 5-time national champion Jón Arnór Stefánsson left KR and signed with its Reykjavík rivals Valur.
- On 6 August, Grindavík signed Estonia national team member Joonas Järveläinen.
- On 15 August, it was reported that Haukar had signed Colombia national team member Hansel Atencia from Þór Akureyri.
- On 23 August, Haukar signed Austin Magnús Bracey.
- On 29 August, Þór Akureyri signed former New Mexico State University center Ivan Aurrecoechea.
- On 1 September, Haukar announced that team captain Haukur Óskarsson would not play the upcoming season for personal reasons.
- On 7 September, two-time Úrvalsdeild Domestic Player of the Year and Iceland national team member Kristófer Acox announced that he was leaving KR due to a disagreement between him and the club. Four days later, he signed with KR's Reykjavík rivals Valur. On 24 September, it was reported that KR was refusing to sign his transfer papers to Valur. On 30 September, KR finally signed Kristófer's transfer papers, officially making him a Valur player.
- On 11 September, it was reported that Stjarnan had signed Sweden national team member Alexander Lindqvist.
- On 18 September, KR announced it had signed former Swedish Basketball League scoring champion Ty Sabin along with Ante Gospic.
- On 22 September, Njarðvík signed journeyman Zvonko Buljan.
- On 7 October, Njarðvík's Zvonko Buljan was suspended for three games for grabbing the genital area of an opposing player from KR on 3 October.
- On 7 October, the season was postponed for two weeks due to another outbreak of Covid-19 in Iceland.
- On 19 October, the Icelandic Basketball Association further postponed the season until 3 November.
- On 19 October, Þór Akureyri announced they had laid off head coach Andrew Johnston as it could not afford to keep him on they payroll due to the third outbreak of Covid-19 in Iceland. At the time, the team had only played one game, a home loss against contenders Keflavík.
- On 24 October, Valur signed Portugal national team member Miguel Cardoso.
- On 29 November, Njarðvík announced that it had released Zvonko Buljan and Ryan Montgomery at their own request due to the Coronavirus stoppage in Iceland.
- On 4 December, Haukar agreed to release Kári Jónsson from his contract so he could sign with LEB Oro club Bàsquet Girona.
- On 8 December, Haukar signed Ingvi Þór Guðmundsson who had started the season with Dresden Titans.
- On 5 January, Haukar announced it had signed Earvin Lee Morris and Ireland national team member Brian Fitzpatrick.
- On 5 January, Njarðvík announced the signing of former Úrvalsdeild Foreign Player of the Year Antonio Hester.
- On 5 January, Höttur signed American Michael Mallory.
- On 21 January, it was reported that KR had signed Brandon Nazione.
- On 26 January, it was reported that Þór Akureyri had signed Côte d'Ivoire national team player Guy Edi.
- On 29 January, Njarðvík signed former Olympian Kyle Johnson.
- On 30 January, it was reported that ÍR had signed Zvonko Buljan who had started the season with Njarðvík.
- On 8 February, Tómas Þórður Hilmarsson returned to Stjarnan after playing Spain.
- On 10 February, Höttur signed Netherlands national team player Bryan Alberts.
- On 11 February, it was reported that former Haukar player Hjálmar Stefánsson would leave Spanish club CB Carbajosa and return to Iceland to join Valur, much to the displeasure of Haukar who threatened legal action as they believed that he was still under contract obligations not to play for any other team in Iceland except them until after the season. On 27 February, the Icelandic Basketball Association confirmed his transfer from Carbajosa to Valur. On 5 March it was reported that Haukar would not pursue a legal case in the matter.
- On 15 February, Haukar announced it had signed former Lega Basket Serie A player Pablo Bertone.
- On 20 February, KR signed Denmark national team member Zarko Jukić.
- On 23 February, it was reported that Ingvi Þór Guðmundsson had left Haukar and signed with Þór Akureyri.
- On 13 March, it was announced that Shawn Glover had left Tindastóll after falling out with head coach Baldur Þór Ragnarsson. In 11 games for Tindastóll, Glover averaged a team leading 26.2 points and 7.4 rebounds.
- On 16 March, Haukar fired head coach Israel Martín after a 3-11 start. The day after, assistant coach Sævaldur Bjarnason was introduced as his replacement.
- On 17 March, Keflavík terminated their contract with American forward Max Montana for breach of disciplinary rules.
- On 28 May, Jón Arnór Stefánsson announced his retirement from basketball following Valur's 2-3 loss against KR in the first round of the Úrvalsdeild playoffs.
- On 7 June, Jakob Sigurðarson announced his retirement from basketball following KR's 0-3 loss against Keflavík in the semi-finals of the Úrvalsdeild playoffs.
