= 2024–25 Úrvalsdeild kvenna (basketball) =

Women's basketball league in Iceland

Bónus deild kvenna^{1}
- Dates: Regular season: 1 October 2024 – 19 February 2025; Winners and losers stage: 25 February – 26 March 2025; Play Offs: 31 March – 13 May 2025
- Teams: 10
- TV partner: Stöð 2 Sport

Regular season
- Top seed: Haukar
- Relegated: Þór Akureyri; Aþena

Finals
- Champions: Haukar {5th title)
- Runners-up: Njarðvík
- Finals MVP: (Iceland) Þóra Kristín Jónsdóttir

Awards
- Domestic MVP: (Iceland) Þóra Kristín Jónsdóttir
- Foreign MVP: (United States) Brittanny Dinkins

Statistical leaders
| Points | (United States) Jasmine Dickey | 29.1 |
| Rebounds | (United States) Maddie Sutton | 16.5 |
| Assists | (United States) Abby Beeman | 9.0 |
| Steals | (United States) Abby Beeman | 3.5 |
| Blocks | (Iceland) Isabella Sigurðardóttir | 1.8 |
- All statistics correct as of 10 May 2024.^{1} Sponsored league name, referring to Úrvalsdeild kvenna.

The 2024–25 Úrvalsdeild kvenna is the 68th season of the Úrvalsdeild kvenna, the top tier women's basketball league on Iceland. It starts in October 2024 with the first round of the regular season and ends in May 2025.

Keflavík are the defending champions.

Haukar won their fifth title after beating Njarðvík in the final.

== Competition format ==
The league consists of 10 teams with a 8 team playoff tournament. The bottom team will be relegated to the 1. deild kvenna while the team in 9th place will face the teams in 2-4 place in the 1. deild in a playoff for a spot in the Úrvalsdeild.

== Teams ==
| Team | City, Region | Arena | Head coach |
|---|---|---|---|
| Aþena | Breiðholt | Smárinn | (Iceland) Brynjar Karl Sigurðsson |
| Grindavík | Grindavík | HS Orku-höllin | (Iceland) Þorleifur Ólafsson |
| Haukar | Hafnarfjörður | Schenkerhöllin | (Iceland) Emil Barja |
| Hamar/Þór | Hveragerði/Þorlákshöfn | | (Iceland) Hallgrímur Brynjólfsson |
| Keflavík | Keflavík | TM Höllin | (Iceland) Friðrik Ingi Rúnarsson |
| Njarðvík | Njarðvík | Ljónagryfjan | (Iceland) Einar Árni Jóhannsson |
| Stjarnan | Reykjavík | Mathús Garðabæjar höllin | (Iceland) Ólafur Jónas Sigurðsson |
| Valur | Reykjavík | Origo-völlurinn | (Canada) Jamil Abiad |
| Þór Akureyri | Akureyri | Síðuskóli | (Iceland) Daníel Andri Halldórsson |

== Managerial changes ==
| Team | Outgoing manager | Manner of departure | Date of vacancy | Position in table | Replaced with | Date of appointment |
|---|---|---|---|---|---|---|
| Stjarnan | (Iceland) Arnar Guðjónsson | End of contract | May 2024 | Off-season | (Iceland) Ólafur Jónas Sigurðsson | 4 April 2024 |
| Haukar | (Iceland) Ingvar Guðjónsson | End of contract | 24 April 2024 | Off-season | (Iceland) Emil Barja | 2 May 2024 |
| Valur | (Iceland) Hjalti Þór Vilhjálmsson | End of contract | 22 May 2024 | Off-season | (Canada) Jamil Abiad | 22 May 2024 |
| Njarðvík | (Iceland) Rúnar Ingi Erlingsson | End of contract | 22 May 2024 | Off-season | (Iceland) Einar Árni Jóhannsson | 24 May 2024 |
| Keflavík | (Iceland) Sverrir Þór Sverrisson | End of contract | 22 May 2024 | Off-season | (Iceland) Friðrik Ingi Rúnarsson | 7 June 2024 |

== Regular season ==
| Pos | Team | Pld | W | L | PF | PA | PD | Pts | Qualification |
|---|---|---|---|---|---|---|---|---|---|
| 1 | Haukar | 18 | 15 | 3 | 1585 | 1387 | +198 | 33 | Winners stage |
| 2 | Njarðvík | 18 | 13 | 5 | 1470 | 1384 | +86 | 31 | Winners stage |
| 3 | Þór Akureyri | 18 | 12 | 6 | 1595 | 1501 | +94 | 30 (Note: Þór Akureyri 202–184 Keflavík) | Winners stage |
| 4 | Keflavík | 18 | 12 | 6 | 1560 | 1467 | +93 | 30 | Winners stage |
| 5 | Valur | 18 | 8 | 10 | 1317 | 1343 | −26 | 26 (Note: Valur 2–0 Tindastóll) | Winners stage |
| 6 | Tindastóll | 18 | 8 | 10 | 1449 | 1461 | −12 | 26 | Losers stage |
| 7 | Stjarnan | 18 | 7 | 11 | 1394 | 1519 | −125 | 25 | Losers stage |
| 8 | Grindavík | 18 | 6 | 12 | 1292 | 1312 | −20 | 24 (Note: Grindavík 172–131 Hamar/Þór) | Losers stage |
| 9 | Hamar/Þór | 18 | 6 | 12 | 1460 | 1637 | −177 | 24 | Losers stage |
| 10 | Aþena | 18 | 3 | 15 | 1314 | 1425 | −111 | 21 | Losers stage |

Source: Úrvalsdeild kvenna
Rules for classification: 1) Points; 2) Points difference; 3) Points scored.

=== Winners stage ===
| Pos | Team | Pld | W | L | PF | PA | PD | Pts | Qualification |
|---|---|---|---|---|---|---|---|---|---|
| 1 | Haukar | 22 | 19 | 3 | 1979 | 1701 | +278 | 41 | Play Offs |
| 2 | Njarðvík | 22 | 16 | 6 | 1826 | 1734 | +92 | 38 | Play Offs |
| 3 | Keflavík | 22 | 13 | 9 | 1915 | 1842 | +73 | 35 (Note: Keflavík 2–1 Þór Akureyri) | Play Offs |
| 4 | Þór Akureyri (Note: Þór Akureyri decided to withdraw from the league next season and play in the second division instead.) | 22 | 13 | 9 | 1920 | 1854 | +66 | 35 | Relegation |
| 5 | Valur | 22 | 9 | 13 | 1624 | 1688 | −64 | 31 | Play Offs |

Source: Úrvalsdeild kvenna
Rules for classification: 1) Points; 2) Points difference; 3) Points scored.

=== Losers stage ===
| Pos | Team | Pld | W | L | PF | PA | PD | Pts | Qualification |
|---|---|---|---|---|---|---|---|---|---|
| 6 | Tindastóll | 22 | 10 | 12 | 1757 | 1785 | −28 | 32 | Play Offs |
| 7 | Stjarnan | 22 | 9 | 13 | 1695 | 1811 | −116 | 31 | Play Offs |
| 8 | Grindavík | 22 | 8 | 14 | 1617 | 1638 | −21 | 30 (Note: Grindavík 2–1 Hamar/Þór) | Play Offs |
| 9 | Hamar/Þór (Note: Hamar/Þór lost the relegation play off, however, were given a reprieve after Þór Akureyri decided to withdraw from the league.) | 22 | 8 | 14 | 1792 | 1960 | −168 | 30 | Relegation Play Off |
| 10 | Aþena | 22 | 5 | 17 | 1640 | 1752 | −112 | 27 | Relegation |

Source: Úrvalsdeild kvenna
Rules for classification: 1) Points; 2) Points difference; 3) Points scored.

== Playoffs ==
Quarterfinals
1 | Haukar | 86 | 73 | 76 | 86 | 79 | 3
8 | Grindavík | 91 | 87 | 73 | 81 | 64 | 2
4 | Þór Akureyri | 86 | 75 | 72 | 70 | 1
5 | Valur | 92 | 102 | 60 | 75 | 3
2 | Njarðvík | 84 | 89 | 95 | 3
7 | Stjarnan | 75 | 72 | 89 | 0
3 | Keflavík | 92 | 90 | 88 | 3
6 | Tindastóll | 63 | 78 | 58 | 0

Semifinals
1 | Haukar | 79 | 101 | 82 | 3
5 | Valur | 66 | 80 | 64 | 0
2 | Njarðvík | 95 | 76 | 101 | 3
3 | Keflavík | 80 | 73 | 89 | 0

Final
1 | Haukar | 86 | 90 | 93 | 78 | 92 | 3
2 | Njarðvík | 79 | 72 | 95 | 94 | 91 | 2

Champions of Iceland

Haukar
Fifth title

== Notable occurrences ==
- On 31 May, the board of Fjölnir announced it had withdrawn the team from the league due to financial difficulties.
- On 21 June, Danielle Rodriguez left Grindavík and signed with BCF Elfic Fribourg Basket.
- On 21 June, Sóllilja Bjarnadóttir signed with Grindavík.
- On 8 July, Grindavík signed Isabella Ósk Sigurðardóttir.
- On 17 July, former Úrvalsdeild Foreign Player of the Year, Brittanny Dinkins, signed with Njarðvík.
