= Ungmennafélag Kjalnesinga =

Icelandic sports club

UMFK
- Full name: Ungmennafélag Kjalnesinga
- Short name: UMFK
- Sport: Athletics; Basketball; Football; Swimming
- Founded: 26 May 1938; 88 years ago
- Based in: Kjalarnes, Reykjavík
- Website: umfk.is

Ungmennafélag Kjalnesinga (Icelandic pronunciation: [ˈuŋkˌmɛnːaˌfjɛːˌlaːɣ ˈcʰalˌnɛːsiŋka], lit. 'Kjalarnes Youth Club' (Note: Kjalnesinga is the adjective and demonym of Kjalarnes.)), commonly known as UMFK, is an Icelandic multi-sports club based in Kjalarnes, Reykjavík, in the capital area of Iceland. The club fields departments in athletics, basketball, football, and swimming. It was founded on 26 May 1938.

== Basketball ==
The club fields junior teams and a senior women's team. The clubs girls junior teams where featured in the 2021 documentary Raise the bar.

=== Women's basketball ===
The club fielded a women's basketball team in collaboration with Aþena Basketball, named Aþena-UMFK, in the second-tier 1. deild kvenna and the Icelandic Cup. After initially being allowed to play their home games at the Álftanes stadium for the 2021–2022 season, the team was denied its use by Garðabær officials at the behest of rival club Stjarnan. The team later received and accepted an offer from Akranes to play their games at Vesturgata.

On 7 May 2024, Aþena achieved promotion to the top-tier Úrvalsdeild kvenna for the first time in its history.
