= Gerald Robinson (basketball, born 1984) =

American-Dutch basketball player

Personal information
- Born: September 15, 1984 (age 42) Memphis, Tennessee
- Listed height: 2.02 m (6 ft 8 in)
- Listed weight: 104 kg (229 lb)

Career information
- College: Aiken Tech (2004–2006); Tennessee–Martin (2006–2008)
- NBA draft: 2008: undrafted
- Playing career: 2008–2023
- Position: Power forward

Career history
- 2008: Oviedo
- 2008–2009: Cantabria
- 2009: Plymouth Raiders
- 2009–2010: USC Freiburg
- 2010–2011: Haukar
- 2011–2012: Landstede Zwolle
- 2012–2013: Apollon Limassol
- 2013: BSW
- 2013: Cheshire Phoenix
- 2014: Höttur
- 2014: Plymouth Raiders
- 2015–2016: Apollo Amsterdam
- 2016–2017: Calais Basket Cheminots
- 2018: Pichincha Potosi
- 2017–2018: Surrey Scorchers
- 2018–2019: ÍR
- 2019–2020: Haukar
- 2020–2021: Sindri Höfn
- 2021–2023: Selfoss

Career highlights
- Úrvalsdeild karla rebounding leader (2011); OVC All-Newcomer Team (2007); All-OVC Second Team (2008)

Gerald Robinson (born September 15, 1984) is an American-Dutch basketball. The 230 lb, 6 ft 9 power forward attended University of Tennessee at Martin, and started his career in the Spanish LEB Bronze league with Oviedo CB and later Cantabria Baloncesto. Later on Robinson also played for teams in the Netherlands, Cyprus, and Iceland.

== Playing career ==
Robinson spent the 2010–2011 season with Haukar where he averaged 20.6 points and league leading 13.6 rebounds during the regular season. In January 2014, he signed with Höttur of the Höttur where he averaged 21.9 points and 9.6 rebounds during the regular season and playoffs.

Robinson spent the 2017–2018 season with the Surrey Scorchers of the British Basketball League, averaging 13.8 points and 6.1 rebounds.

In June, 2018, Robinson signed with Njarðvík of the Úrvalsdeild karla. He was released by Njarðvík on 27 September 2018 prior to the start of the season. In October he signed with ÍR. In 22 regular season games, Robinson averaged 18.3 points and team leading 9.5 rebounds per game. On April 1, 2019, he helped ÍR to victory in game 5 of its first-round playoff series against second seeded Njarðvík. With the victory, ÍR became the third team in the Úrvalsdeild history to come back from a 0–2 deficit and win a best-of-five series. On April 19, he scored 22 points in ÍR's game 5 victory against top seeded Stjarnan, helping ÍR to the Úrvalsdeild finals.

On August 25, 2019, Robinson signed with Haukar with whom he previously played during the 2010–11 Úrvalsdeild season.

On 4 August 2020, Robinson signed with 1. deild karla club Sindri Höfn. In 19 games, he averaged 22.3 points and 10.1 rebounds per game for Sindri which finished with the third best record in the league.

In July 2021, Robinson signed with rival 1. deild club Körfuknattleiksfélag Selfoss. During his first season with the club, he averaged 24.2 points and 12.6 rebounds per game.
