= Kinu Rochford =

American basketball player (1990–2026)

Personal information
- Born: October 26, 1990 New York City, U.S.
- Died: July 10, 2026 (aged 35) New York City, U.S.
- Listed height: 6 ft 6 in (1.98 m)
- Listed weight: 235 lb (107 kg)

Career information
- High school: James Madison (Brooklyn, New York, U.S.)
- College: Globe Tech (2009–2011); Fairleigh Dickinson (2011–2013)
- Playing career: 2013–2021
- Position: Forward
- Number: 3

Career history
- 2013: Aris Leeuwarden
- 2014: Elitzur Yavne
- 2015: ESSM Le Portel
- 2015–2016: Cheshire Phoenix
- 2016: BC Boncourt Red Team
- 2017: Garonne ASPTT
- 2017: Sūduva-Mantinga
- 2017–2018: Plymouth Raiders
- 2018–2019: Þór Þorlákshöfn
- 2019: Hamar
- 2019: Terceira Basket
- 2021: Golden Eagle Ylli

Career highlights
- NKL champion (2017); Úrvalsdeild karla rebounding leader (2019)

Kinu Ashton Rochford (October 26, 1990 – July 10, 2026) was an American basketball player. He played college basketball for Globe Tech and Fairleigh Dickinson before embarking on a professional career in 2013. In 2017, he won the NKL championship with Garonne Sūduva-Mantinga. Playing the forward position, he led the Icelandic Úrvalsdeild karla in rebounds during the 2018–2019 season. He also played professionally in France, Kosovo, Israel, Netherlands, United Kingdom and Switzerland.

== Early life ==
Rochford was born in Brooklyn in New York City to Eden Rochford and Wayne Noel. He was one of three triplets, along with his sister Kye, and a brother, Kairo.

== High school ==
Rochford attended James Madison High School in Brooklyn where he averaged 10 points and 10 rebounds as a senior.

== College career ==
After receiving no Division I scholarship offers, Rochford played for Globe Institute of Technology for two years, where he averaged 14 points and 14 rebounds per game while earning the Region XV Player of the Year honors as a sophomore. He transferred to Fairleigh Dickinson in 2011 on the behest of Fairleigh's head coach Greg Vetrone. During his first season with the school, Rochford posted modest numbers of 9.3 points and 6.8 rebounds per game. During his senior season, he was moved to the center positions and transformed into one of the best players of the Northeast Conference. For the season he averaged 14.7 points and 8.9 rebounds in 27 games.

== Professional career ==
Rochford's first professional stop was in 2013 with Aris Leeuwarden in the Dutch Basketball League where he averaged 12.2 points and 7.8 rebounds in 10 games. In March 2014, he joined Elitzur Yavne of the Israeli second division. In 10 games he averaged a team leading 21.3 points and 11.2 rebounds.

In 2015, Rochford signed with ESSM Le Portel of the LNB Pro B, replacing injured Claude Marquis. In 22 games for Le Portel, he averaged 10.6 points and 5.6 rebounds per game.

Rochford spent the 2016–2017 season with Cheshire Phoenix in the British Basketball League. He was named the BBL Player of the Month in January after averaging 17.8 points and 14.0 rebounds per game. For the season, he averaged 19.6 points and 10.2 rebounds per game.

In 2016, Rochford joined Saint-Chamond Basket of the LNB Pro B. He left the club in middle of September, prior to the start of the season. In October 2016, he signed with BC Boncourt Red Team of the Swiss Basketball League where he averaged 13.0 points and 6.4 rebounds in 7 games before being released in end of November. In January 2017, he joined Sūduva-Mantinga of the Lithuanian National Basketball League where he averaged 11.2 points and 5.4 rebounds in 22 games, helping the team repeat as NKL champions.

In August 2017, he signed with Garonne ASPTT of the French NM2.

In October 2017, Rochford returned to the BBL and signed with Plymouth Raiders. In February 2018, Rochford was released. In 14 games for the Raiders, he averaged 12.5 points and 8.9 rebounds per game.

In September 2018, Rochford moved to the Icelandic Úrvalsdeild karla and signed with Þór Þorlákshöfn where he quickly became one of the league's best players. On 1 April 2019, Rochford scored 23 points in the fifth and deciding game of Þór's 3–2 upset against Tindastóll in the first round of the playoffs. With 7 seconds left of the game, he helped steal an inbound pass from Tindastóll that led to Halldór Garðar Hermannsson scoring the game winning basket with 2 seconds left. In the semi-finals, Þór lost to KR 1–3. During the regular season, he averaged 19.1 points and led the league with 12.2 rebounds per game.

He continued his career in Iceland the following season, signing with 1. deild karla club Hamar in September 2019. On 17 October, he posted seasons high 27 points and 20 rebounds in a victory against Breiðablik. After only four games, where he averaged 11.8 points and 9.3 rebounds, Hamar released Rochford from his contract.

In December 2019, he joined Terceira Basket where he averaged 11.8 points and 10.2 rebounds in 6 games. His last professional stint was with Golden Eagle Ylli in the Kosovo Basketball Superleague in 2021.

== Later life and death ==
Following his basketball career, Rochford worked as a coordinator for WIN, a homeless service provider in New York City.

Rochford was shot and killed on July 10, 2026, at the age of 35, during a basketball tournament in Harlem, New York City. The shooting also wounded two other people. The days after his death, several of his former teams and teammates paid tribute, and New York City mayor Zohran Mamdani tweeted his condolences for his family. On July 12, hundreds of people attended his vigil in Brooklyn, New York.

== Career statistics ==
Legend
GP	Games played	GS	Games started	MPG	Minutes per game
FG%	Field goal percentage	3P%	3-point field goal percentage	FT%	Free throw percentage
RPG	Rebounds per game	APG	Assists per game	SPG	Steals per game
BPG	Blocks per game	PPG	Points per game	**Bold**	Career high

=== College ===
*	Led Northeast Conference

Year	Team	GP	GS	MPG	FG%	3P%	FT%	RPG	APG	SPG	BPG	PPG
2011–12	Farleigh Dickinson	**29**	19	25.5	.559	.000	.479	6.8	1.0	**.8**	.9	9.3
2012–13	Farleigh Dickinson	27	**24**	**29.0**	**.592***	–	**.673**	**8.9***	**2.0**	.7	**1.3**	**14.7**
Career		56	43	27.2	.578	.000	.593	7.8	1.4	.8	1.1	11.9

=== Professional ===
*	Led league

Year	Team	GP	GS	MPG	FG%	3P%	FT%	RPG	APG	SPG	BPG	PPG
2018–19	Þór Þorlákshöfn	22	22	30.5	.568	.250	.681	**12.2***	3.9	1.4	1.4	19.1
2019–20	Hamar	4	4	21.0	.459	.250	.800	9.3	3.5	.5	0.3	11.8
