= Axel Kárason =

Icelandic basketball player (born 1983)

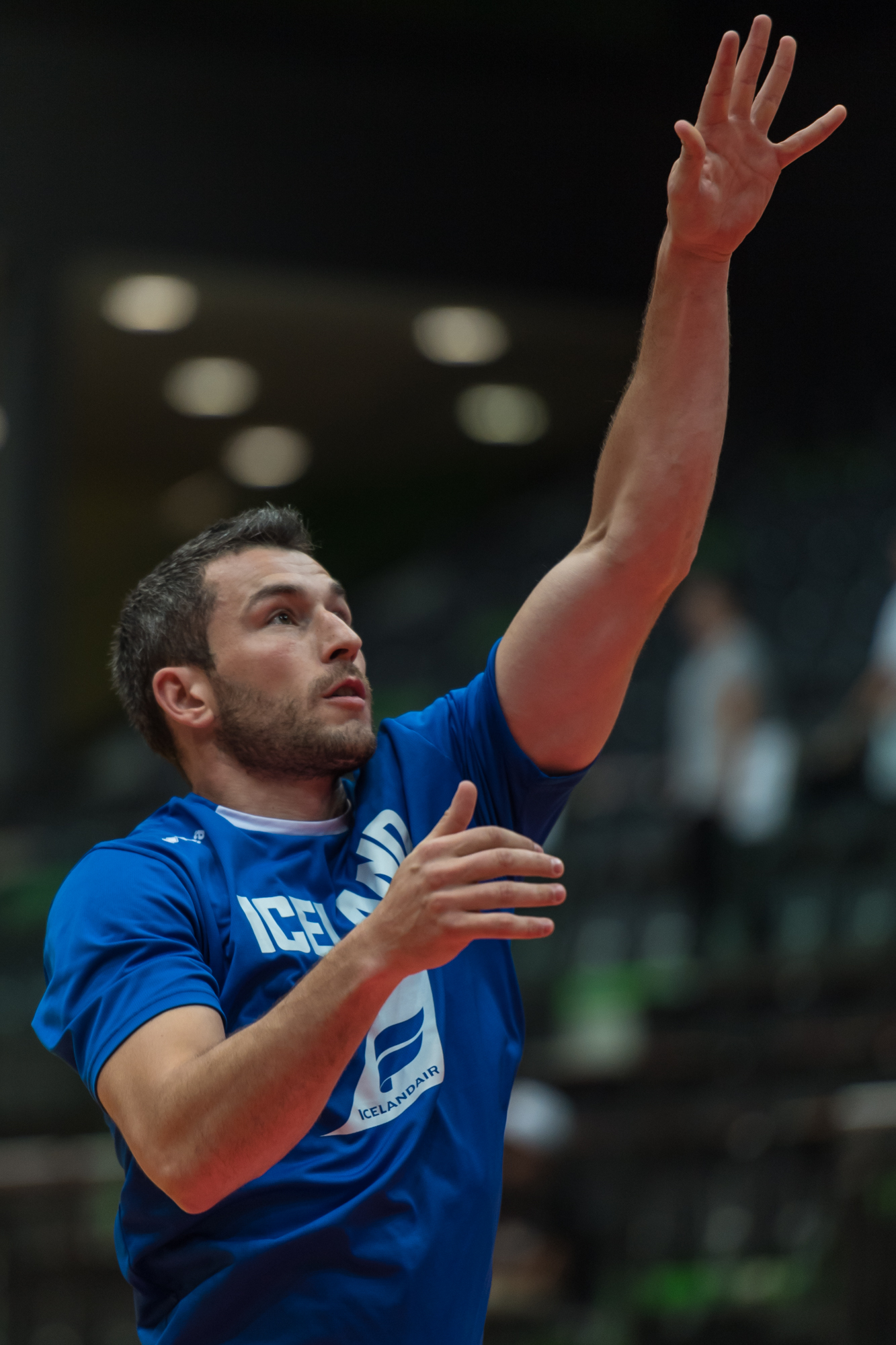

Personal information
- Born: 11 February 1983 (age 43) Sauðárkrókur, Iceland
- Listed height: 1.93 m (6 ft 4 in)
- Listed weight: 98 kg (216 lb)

Career information
- Playing career: 2001–2023
- Position: Small forward
- Number: 4

Career history
- 2001–2005: Tindastóll
- 2005–2008: Skallagrímur
- 2008–2010: Tindastóll
- 2010–2015: Værløse Basket
- 2015–2017: Svendborg Rabbits
- 2017–2018: Tindastóll
- 2019–2023: Tindastóll

Career highlights
- Icelandic champion (2023); Icelandic Cup (2018)

Axel Kárason (born 11 February 1983) is an Icelandic former basketball player and a former member of the Icelandic national team, where he participated at the EuroBasket 2015. He won the Icelandic championship in 2023 and the Icelandic Cup in 2018 with Tindastóll.

== Playing career ==
Axel spent the early part of his career with Tindastóll and Skallagrímur. He was a key player on the Skallagrímur team that went to the 2006 Úrvalsdeild finals where it lost to Njarðvík. In 2015, Axel signed with Svendborg Rabbits, after five seasons with Værløse Basket, and remained there until 2017 when he moved back to the Icelandic Úrvalsdeild karla and signed with his hometown team, Tindastóll.

On January 13, 2018, he helped Tindastóll to its first major title when they beat KR in Icelandic Basketball Cup finals.

In September 2018, it was reported that Axel would not play during the 2018–2019 season. In an interview with Vísir.is, he stated that his departure from Tindastóll was for personal reasons and denied rumors of his alleged unhappiness with the club signing Brynjar Þór Björnsson during the off-season.

In January 2019, Axel signed with Tindastóll for the rest of the season.

In 2022, he went to the Úrvalsdeild finals for the fourth time in his career, 21 years after his first trip in 2001.

In 2023, he won his first Icelandic championship after Tindastóll defeated Valur 3–2 in a finals rematch.

== National team ==
Axel was a member of the Icelandic national basketball team from 2006 to 2017, appearing in 57 games. He was a member of Iceland's squad at EuroBasket 2015.

== Personal life ==
Axel is the son of former Icelandic national team members Katrín Axelsdóttir and Kári Marísson. He is the brother of former basketball players Arnar Snær Kárason and María Káradóttir and half-brother of former Icelandic Women's Basketball Player of the Year Kristín Björk Jónsdóttir. Outside of basketball, Axel is a licensed veterinarian.

== External ==
- 2001-2007 statistics
- KKÍ.is player profile
