= Chris Caird =

English basketball player and coach

Christopher Caird
Napoli Basket
- Title: Assistant coach
- League: LBA

Personal information
- Born: 26 May 1989 (age 37) Daventry, England
- Listed height: 198 cm (6 ft 6 in)
- Listed weight: 98 kg (216 lb)

Career information
- College: Marshalltown (2010–2013); Drake (2013–2015)
- Playing career: 2007–2018
- Position: Shooting guard / small forward
- Number: 13, 25
- Coaching career: 2018–present

Career history

Playing
- 2007–2010: FSu Basket
- 2015–2016: FSu Basket
- 2016–2018: Tindastóll
- 2018: Selfoss-Basket

Coaching
- 2018: Tindastóll (assistant)
- 2018–2023: Selfoss-Basket
- 2023–2024: London Lions (assistant)
- 2024-2025: Nagasaki Velca (assistant)
- 2025-present: Napoli Basket (assistant)

Career highlights
- As assistant coach: Icelandic Men's Cup (2018); British Basketball League champion (2024); British Basketball League Cup runner up (2024); British Basketball League All Star game (2024); Euro Cup Final 4 (2024)

Christopher William C. Caird (born 26 May 1989) is an English basketball coach and former member of the Great Britain men's national basketball team.

== College ==
Caird committed to Syracuse University his freshman season, NCAA issues resulted in him changing his team to Marshalltown Community College for that season. He then committed to Santa Clara University. Knee injury shortly before arrival had him sit out the next season and resulted in him completing a second season at Marshalltown Community College. He finished his college career for Drake University from 2013 to 2015.

== Career ==
Caird first senior games came during the 2007–2008 season as a member of FSu Basket. He played for FSu until 2010 when he move to the United States to attend college. He returned to FSu in 2015 and averaged 19.4 points and 7.4 rebounds for the club during the 2015-2016 Úrvalsdeild season. However, a hip injury that required surgery cut his season short and he was unable to prevent FSu from being relegated back to Division I

After the season, Caird signed with Tindastóll. Despite being hobbled by injuries, he was named to the Úrvalsdeild All-first team for the first half of the 2016–2017 season. In January 2018 he was forced to retire as a player due to persistent knee injury and was subsequently hired as an assistant coach to Tindastóll men's basketball team.

In May 2018, Caird was hired as the head coach of Selfoss-Basket. On 22 November he returned to the court with Selfoss, playing 23 minutes and scoring 18 points against Höttur. In April 2023, he stepped down as head coach after five seasons.

== Awards, titles and accomplishments ==
- Icelandic Basketball Cup: 2018
