= Aþena Basketball =

- Founded: 19 June 2019; 5 years ago
- History: Aþena (2019–present)
- Location: Breiðholt, Reykjavík
- Head coach: (W) Brynjar Karl Sigurðsson
- Website: athenabasketball.com

Aþena Basketball is an Icelandic basketball club. The club fields junior teams and a senior women's team. The clubs girls junior teams where featured in the 2021 documentary Raise the bar. Its women's senior team will play in the Icelandic top-tier Úrvalsdeild kvenna in the 2024–25 season.

== History ==
The club was founded in 2019 and first fielded a women's senior team in 2021, named Aþena-UMFK in partnership with Ungmennafélag Kjalnesinga, that played in the second-tier 1. deild kvenna and in the Icelandic Cup. After initially being allowed to play their home games at the Álftanes stadium for the 2021–2022 season, the team was denied its use by Garðabær officials at the behest of rival club Stjarnan. The team later received and accepted an offer from Akranes to play their games at Vesturgata.

On 7 May 2024, Aþena achieved promotion to the top-tier Úrvalsdeild kvenna for the first time in its history. After one season, Aþena was relegated back to 1. deild.

== Notable players ==
Criteria

To appear in this section a player must have either:

- Played at least three seasons for the club.
- Set a club record or won an individual award while at the club.
- Played at least one official international match for their national team at any time.
- Played at least one official WNBA match at any time.

- (Iceland) Bergþóra Holton Tómasdóttir
- (Iceland) Fanney Lind Thomas
- (United States) Jordan Danberry

== Coaches ==
- (Iceland) Brynjar Karl Sigurðsson 2021–present
