= Katrín Axelsdóttir =

Icelandic multi-sport athlete (1956–1994)

Personal information
- Nationality: Icelandic
- Born: 13 April 1956 Reykjavík, Iceland
- Died: 25 June 1994 (aged 38) Reykjavík, Iceland
- Spouse: Kári Marísson (m. 1976)

Sport
- Sport: Basketball, Football, Handball

Katrín Axelsdóttir (13 April 1956 – 25 June 1994) was an Icelandic multi-sport athlete, playing basketball, football and handball for Knattspyrnufélag Reykjavíkur and Glímufélagið Ármann. She was a member of both the Icelandic national basketball team and the Icelandic national handball team. In 1973, she won the Icelandic football championship with Ármann.

== Personal life ==
In 1976, Katrín married Kári Marísson. She had four children who all played basketball, Kristín Björk Jónsdóttir, Arnar Snær Kárason, María Káradóttir and Axel Kárason.
