= Kristín Björk Jónsdóttir =

Icelandic basketball player

Personal information
- Born: 7 February 1974 (age 52) Iceland
- Listed height: 173 cm (5 ft 8 in)
- Position: Guard / forward

Career history
- 1991-2002: KR
- 2008: KR
- 2008: → KR-B

Career highlights
- Icelandic Basketball Player of the Year (2001); Úrvalsdeild Domestic Player of the Year (2001); Úrvalsdeild Domestic All-First Team (2001); 3x Icelandic league champion (1999, 2001, 2002); 3× Icelandic Basketball Cup (1999, 2001, 2002); Icelandic Supercup (1999); Icelandic Company Cup (2000)
Medals
Women's basketball
Representing Iceland
Promotion Cup
| Gold medal – first place | 1996 Malta | National Team |
| Silver medal – second place | 2002 Andorra | National Team |
Games of the Small States of Europe
| Gold medal – first place | 1997 Iceland | National Team |

Kristín Björk Jónsdóttir (born 7 February 1974) is an Icelandic former basketball player and a former member of the Icelandic national basketball team. She was the captain of the KR team that won back-to-back national championships in 2001 and 2002. In 2001 she was named the Icelandic Women's Basketball Player of the Year and the Úrvalsdeild Domestic Player of the Year.

== Playing career ==
Kristín started playing basketball at the age of 14 with the junior teams of Tindastóll. She joined KR at the age of 17 and soon started playing with its senior team in the Icelandic top-tier league. She helped KR to its first major title in 12 years when it won the Icelandic Cup on 6 February 1999. Two months later, she won her first national championship after KR went undefeated through the regular season and playoffs.

Kristín was named the captain of KR prior to the 2000-01 season and led the team to four out of the five major trophies of the season. In December she led all scorers with 18 points in KR's victory against Keflavík in the Icelandic Company Cup finals. In February, she helped KR to its eighth Icelandic Cup by scoring 18 points in a 76-58 victory against Keflavík. In the Úrvalsdeild, KR posted the best record for the third straight season and advanced to the Úrvalsdeild finals where they faced Keflavík once again. On 1 April 2001, KR completed a sweep of Keflavík, 3-0, in the finals and secured its 12th national championship. After the season she was named the Úrvalsdeild Domestic Player of the Year and to the Úrvalsdeild Domestic All-First Team.

In December 2001, she was named the Icelandic Women's Basketball Player of the Year by the Icelandic Basketball Federation.

In April 2002, Kristín helped KR overcome a 0-2 deficit against ÍS in the Úrvalsdeild finals to win the national championship for the second year in a row.

The following season, Kristín moved to the United States for study but managed to appear in one game, the Company Cup finals on December 21, 2002. She last appeared in 7 games during the first half of the 2008-2009 season, including one Cup game with KR-b.

== National team career ==
Kristín played 25 games for the Icelandic national basketball team from 1995 to 2002.

== 2001 drug case controversy ==
In 2001, Kristín failed a drug test by the National Olympic and Sports Association of Iceland (ÍSÍ) after using a prescribed medication to treat exercise-induced asthma. The rules regarding the drug in question stated that athletes using it must submit a written statement from a doctor stating that they required the drug, as it could be used for performance enhancement in cold conditions, mainly in outdoor winter sports. The rules however did not stipulate that the statement had to be submitted before the drug test. She submitted the statement during the trial, and as there was no doubt she indeed suffered from asthma and required the drug, the drug court of ÍSÍ cleared her of all charges on 2 May 2001.

The head of the ÍSÍ board of health, Birgir Guðjónsson, was highly criticised for his actions in the case. The Icelandic Basketball Federation claimed that he offered to minimize punishment for two male basketball player who were charged and later suspended for the use of ephedrine, an offer he had no legal grounds to make, if Kristín would admit to a wrongdoing. The claim was backed up by another member of the board of health who was present during the meeting. He was further criticised for not disclosing an email from Francoise Jascinski of FIBA that stated that if Kristín had prescriptions from a doctor for using the drug in question, which she did, then there was therapeutical justification for its use and no sanctions should apply for her per FIBA regulations. He was further criticized by the members of the court for his writings following the trial, that suggested the verdict was influenced by Ellert Schram, the chairman of ÍSÍ, and others. In July 2001, Birgir resigned as the chairman of the board.

== Personal life ==
Kristín is the daughter of two-time Icelandic Basketball Player of the Year and former KR player Jón Sigurðsson and multi-sport athlete Katrín Axelsdóttir. Her stepfather is former national team member Kári Marísson.
