= Kári Marísson =

Icelandic athlete and basketball coach

Personal information
- Born: 20 November 1951 (age 74) Iceland

Career information
- Playing career: 1967–20??
- Coaching career: 1978–2016

Career history

Playing
- 1967–1970: KFR
- 1970–1975: Valur
- 1975–1978: Njarðvík
- 1978–1989: Tindastóll
- 1995–2000: Smári Varmahlíð
- 2000–2005: Tindastóll

Coaching
- 19??–198?: Tindastóll (men's)
- 1989: Tindastóll (men's)
- 1992–1996: Tindastóll (women's)
- 2004–2005: Tindastóll (men's)
- 2014–2015: Tindastóll (men's, assistant)
- 2015: Tindastóll (men's)

Career highlights
- As player: 1. deild karla winner (1988); 2. deild karla winner (1986); As coach: 1. deild karla winner (1988); 2. deild karla winner (1986)

Career coaching record
- Úrvalsdeild karla: 8–20 (.286)
- Úrvalsdeild kvenna: 30–45 (.400)

Kári Marísson (born 20 November 1951) is an Icelandic former multi-sport athlete and basketball coach. He played and coached basketball for several decades and was the oldest player to have played in the Icelandic top-tier Úrvalsdeild karla, at the age of 49 years, until the record was broken by Baldur Þorleifsson in 2015.

== Early life ==
Kári grew up in Árbær in Reykjavík where he competed in pole vault and football.

== Basketball ==
=== Playing career ===
Kári played his first game in with KFR in 1967. In 1975, he left the club, which by that time was named Valur, and signed with Njarðvík. He left Njarðvík at the conclusion of the 1977–78 season and later joined Tindastóll.

=== National team career ===
From 1972 to 1976, Kári played 34 games for the Icelandic national basketball team.

=== Coaching career ===
Kári was a player-coach with Tindastóll for several seasons until 1988 when the team was promoted to the Úrvalsdeild. After spending the 1988–89 season as just a player, he returned to the player-coach role in July 1989. He was fired from his coaching position in October 1989 after a bad start for the team and subsequently stopped playing. He later coached Tindastóll women's team and later the men's team from 2004 to 2005. In October 2015, he temporary took over the team after the firing of Pieti Poikola and until the hiring of José María Costa Gómez.

== Football ==
Kári played 9 games for Íþróttabandalag Akraness in 1973, including 3 in the top-tier league. He appeared in 4 matches in the Icelandic Cup, scoring 2 goals.

== Personal life ==
Kári was married to Katrín Axelsdóttir from 1976 until her death in 1994. He is the father of basketball players Axel Kárason, Arnar Snær Kárason and María Káradóttir and stepfather of former Icelandic Women's Basketball Player of the Year and national team member Kristín Björk Jónsdóttir.
