= Ungmennafélagið Sindri =

- Full name: Ungmennafélagið Sindri
- Short name: Sindri
- Founded: 1934; 92 years ago
- Colours: Red, White
- Chairman: Lárus Páll Pálsson
- Website: umfsindri.is

Ungmennafélagið Sindri (Icelandic pronunciation: [ˈuŋkˌmɛnːaˌfjɛːˌlaijɪð ˈsɪntrɪ], lit. 'Sindri Youth Club' (Note: Ungmennafélagið is the definite form of Ungmennafélag, meaning "the youth club".)), commonly known as Sindri, is an Icelandic multi-sports club from the town of Höfn located on the east coast of Iceland. It fields departments in basketball, football, gymnastics, swimming, track & field and volleyball.

== Basketball ==
Ungmennafélagið Sindri
- Leagues: (M) 1. deild karla (W) 2. deild kvenna
- Arena: Ice Lagoon Höllin
- Location: Höfn, Iceland
- Team colors: Red, White
- Head coach: (M) Israel Martín

=== Men's basketball ===
==== History ====
After a hiatus, Sindri's basketball department was re-started in 2005 with the arrival of Arnar Guðjónsson and Skúli Ingibergur Þórarinsson. On 14 April 2018, Sindri won Division II and achieved promotion to Division I. In May 2018, the club hired Mike Smith, the former assistant coach of the Luxembourg men's national basketball team, as their head coach. On 1 February 2019, the team parted ways with Smith after the team winning only 1 if its 15 games. Skúli Ingibergur Þórarinsson took over from Smith on interim basis. In June 2021 the club hired former Úrvalsdeild Karla Coach of the Year Israel Martín as head coach.

==== Trophies and achievements ====
- Division II
  - Winners (1): 2018
- Division III
  - Winners (1): 2017

==== Notable players ====
- (Iceland) Andrée Michelsson
- (Netherlands) Gerald Robinson
- (Luxembourg) Ivan Delgado

==== Coaches ====
- (Iceland) Arnar Guðjónsson 2005–2007
- (United States) Yima Chia-Kur 2017
- (Iceland) Hallmar Hallsson 2017–2018
- (United States) Mike Smith 2018–2019
- (Iceland) Skúli Ingibergur Þórarinsson 2019
- (Iceland) Halldór Steingrímsson 2019–2020
- (Spain) Pedro Garcia Rosado 2020–2021
- (Spain) Israel Martín 2021–present

=== Women's basketball ===
Sindri women's team currently played in 2. deild kvenna during the 2018–2019 season.

== Football ==
Sindri
- Full name: Ungmennafélagið Sindri
- Founded: 1934; 92 years ago
- Ground: Jökulfellsvöllurinn, Höfn, Iceland
- Capacity: 2,000
- Manager: (M) Óli Stefán Flóventsson (W) Vaselin K.Chilingirov
- League: (M) 3. deild karla (W) 2. deild kvenna
- (M) 2025 (W) 2023: (M) 3. deild karla, 9th of 12 (W) 2. deild kvenna, 10th
Home colours	Away colours

Sindri's men's team currently plays in 3. deild karla while its women's team plays in 1. deild kvenna.

=== Men's football ===
==== Trophies and achievements ====
- Division III
  - Winners (3): 1998, 2012, 2022
  - Runner-up (1): 2005
