= Jamil Abiad =

Canadian basketball player and coach (born 1990)

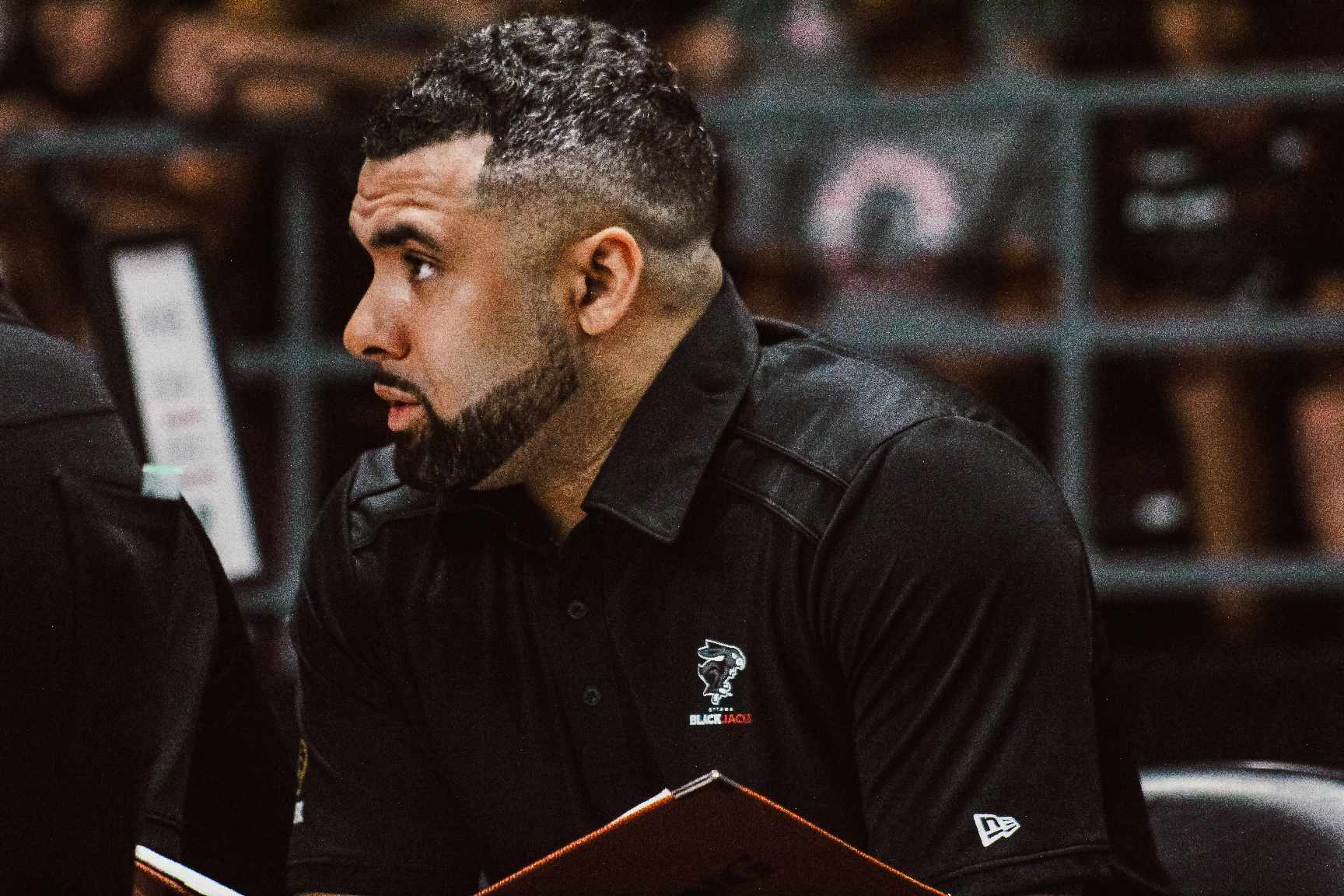

Valur
- Position: Head coach
- League: Úrvalsdeild kvenna

Personal information
- Born: 4 July 1990 (age 36)
- Listed height: 5 ft 11 in (1.80 m)

Career information
- High school: Colonel By (Ottawa, Ontario)
- College: Bishop's (2010–2015)
- Playing career: 2015–2018
- Coaching career: 2021–present

Career history

Playing
- 2016: Hoops Club
- 2016–2017: Wellington
- 2018: Tadamon Zouk

Coaching
- 2021–2022: Ottawa Blackjacks (assistant)
- 2022–present: Valur (M) (assistant)
- 2024–present: Valur (W)
- 2026-present: Iceland (w) (assistant)

Career highlights
- As player: RSEQ champion (2015); As assistant coach: Úrvalsdeild karla champion (2024); 2× Icelandic men' Cup winner (2023, 2025); Icelandic men's Super Cup winner (2023)

Jamil Abiad (born 4 July 1990) is a Canadian basketball coach and former player who is currently the head coach of Valur women's team. He also serves as an assistant coach for Valur men's team and the Iceland women's national team. He played college basketball for Bishop's.

== Playing career ==
=== College career ===
From 2010 til 2015, Abiad played for at Bishop's University. During his senior year, the Bishop's won the RSEQ Men's University Basketball Championship. During his studies at Bishop's University, Abiad competed for U Sports Nationals, where his team ranked 6th and he also received the Garth Smith Award in 2015.

=== Professional career ===
Abiad joined Hoops Club in 2016 where he appeared in 12 league games. From 2016 to 2017, he joined Wellington Basketball Club in the short lived Canadian Basketball League. He later played briefly for Tadamon Zouk in 2018 before retiring.

== Coaching career ==
He started his basketball coaching career with Ottawa Blackjacks for seasons 2021 and 2022.

Since 2022, Abiad has been appointed by Valur basketball club as head coach of the men's U18 and U21 teams and lead assistant coach of the senior men's team. For the season, Valur won the Icelandic Cup and finished with the best regular season record in the Úrvalsdeild karla before losing to Tindastóll in the Úrvalsdeild finals.

In 2016, he founded a media production company named, Next Level Media. In 2019, he established a basketball organization in the Ottawa area named, Team Believe. He is also the brand Ambassador for Under Armour Canada. In 2021, he was featured in a 15 minutes short documentary, The Journey.

On 24 September 2023, he won the Icelandic Super Cup after Valur defeated Tindastóll 80–72.

In May 2024, Abiad was hired as the head coach of Valur women's team while continuing as an assistant for the men's team. On 10 October 2024, he temporary took over Valur men's team after head coach Finnur Freyr Stefánsson took a leave of absence for an undetermined time due to an illness.

In October 2026, Abiad was hired as an assistant coach to the Iceland women's national team.
