= Jordan Danberry =

American basketball player (born 1997)

Personal information
- Born: 25 June 1997 (age 29)
- Listed height: 5 ft 8 in (1.73 m)

Career information
- High school: Conway (Conway, Arkansas)
- College: Arkansas (2015–2017); Mississippi State (2017–2020)
- Position: Guard

Career history
- 2022: Mississippi Lady Lakers
- 2023–2024: Aþena

Career highlights
- SEC All-Defensive Team (2020)

Jordan Kalere Danberry (born 25 June 1997) is an American basketball player. She played college basketball for the Arkansas Razorbacks and the Mississippi State Bulldogs.

== College career ==
Danberry started her college career with Arkansas in 2015 but in January 2017, she transferred to Mississippi State. She finished her college career with Mississippi State in 2020 where she earned SEC All-Defensive Team and second-team All-SEC honors.

== Club career ==
In 2022, she played for the Mississippi Lady Lakers. Prior to the 2023–2024 season, she signed with Aþena of the Icelandic 1. deild kvenna. On 8 November 2023, she posted a quadruple-double, 40 points, 12 rebounds, 13 assists and 17 steals, in a 193–31 win against ÍR. For the season, she averaged 25.9 points, 8.8 rebounds and 5.9 assists.

== Career statistics ==
Legend
GP	Games played	GS	Games started	MPG	Minutes per game	RPG	Rebounds per game
APG	Assists per game	SPG	Steals per game	BPG	Blocks per game	PPG	Points per game
TO	Turnovers per game	FG%	Field-goal percentage	3P%	3-point field-goal percentage	FT%	Free-throw percentage
**Bold**	Career best	°	League leader

=== College ===
Year	Team	GP	GS	MPG	FG%	3P%	FT%	RPG	APG	SPG	BPG	TO	PPG
2015–16	Arkansas	30	13	19.2	33.0	10.7	62.0	2.6	2.3	0.9	0.2	2.8	6.7
2016–17	Arkansas	6	0	12.0	42.1	**66.7**	**76.9**	**3.8**	0.7	0.3	0.0	2.0	4.7
2017–18	Mississippi State	31	0	9.6	36.5	50.0	53.6	1.3	1.1	0.7	0.1	**0.7**	2.8
2018–19	Mississippi State	**36**	**36**	**28.1**	48.3	0.0	62.7	3.4	**3.5**	1.8	**0.5**	2.4	**13.1**
2019–20	Mississippi State	33	32	27.4	**51.7**	25.0	65.5	3.7	3.3	**2.3**	0.4	2.1	12.6
**Career**		136	81	21.0	44.9	16.7	63.3	2.8	2.5	1.4	0.3	2.0	8.8
Statistics retrieved from Sports-Reference.
