= Ilze Jākobsone =

Latvian basketball player

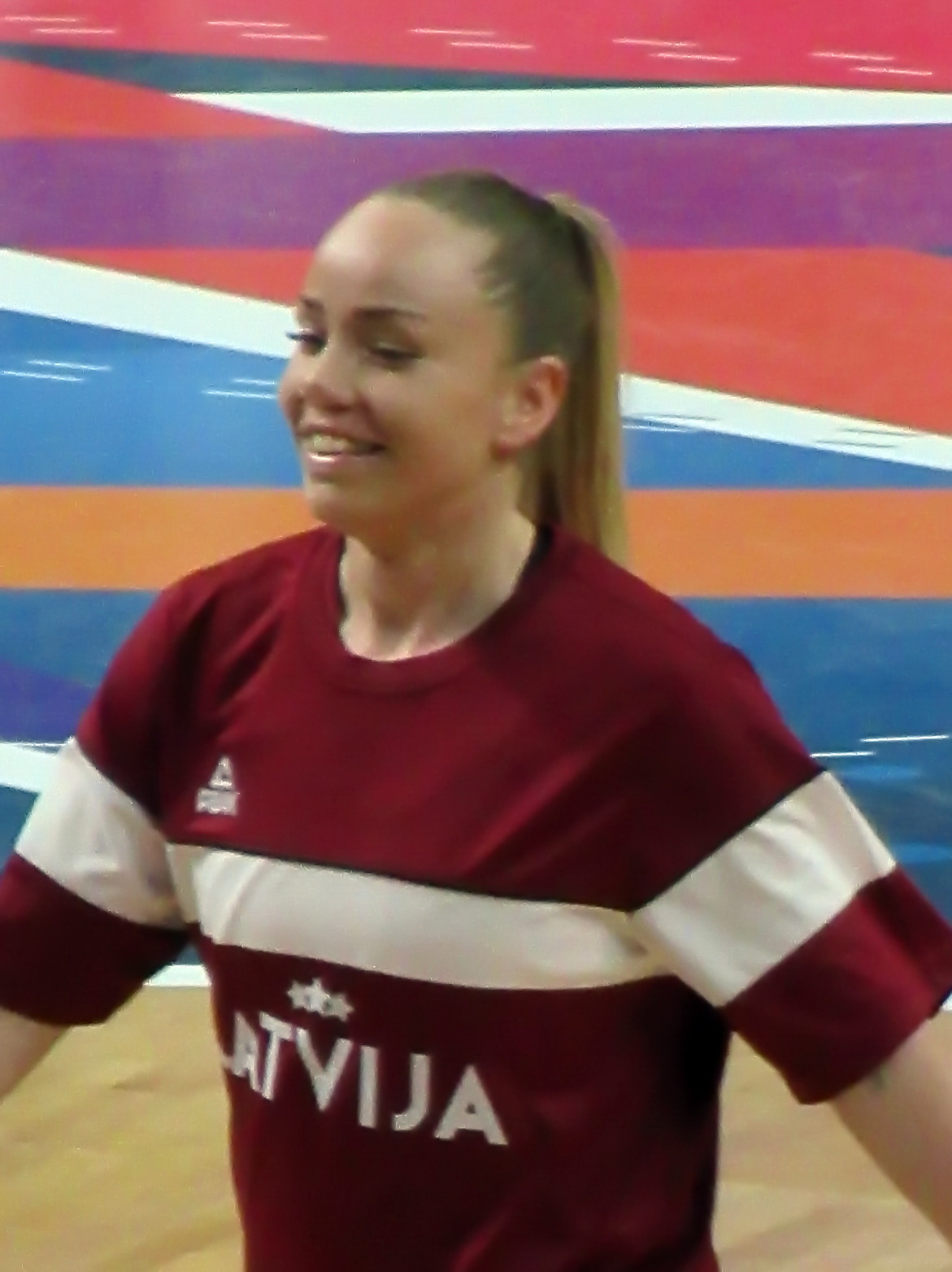

No. 16 – Tindastóll
- Position: Point guard
- League: Úrvalsdeild kvenna

Personal information
- Born: 19 April 1994 (age 32) Riga, Latvia
- Listed height: 5 ft 6 in (1.68 m)
- Listed weight: 169 lb (77 kg)

Career history
- 2024-present: Tindastóll

Ilze Jākobsone (born 19 April 1994) is a Latvian basketball player for Tindastóll and the Latvian national team.

She participated at the EuroBasket Women 2017.

She played for the Paraguayan team Felix Perez at the 2023 Women's Basketball League Americas, averaging 37 minutes, 17.7 points, 3.7 rebounds and 6 assists per game.

In November 2024, Jākobsone joined Tindastóll of the Icelandic Úrvalsdeild kvenna.

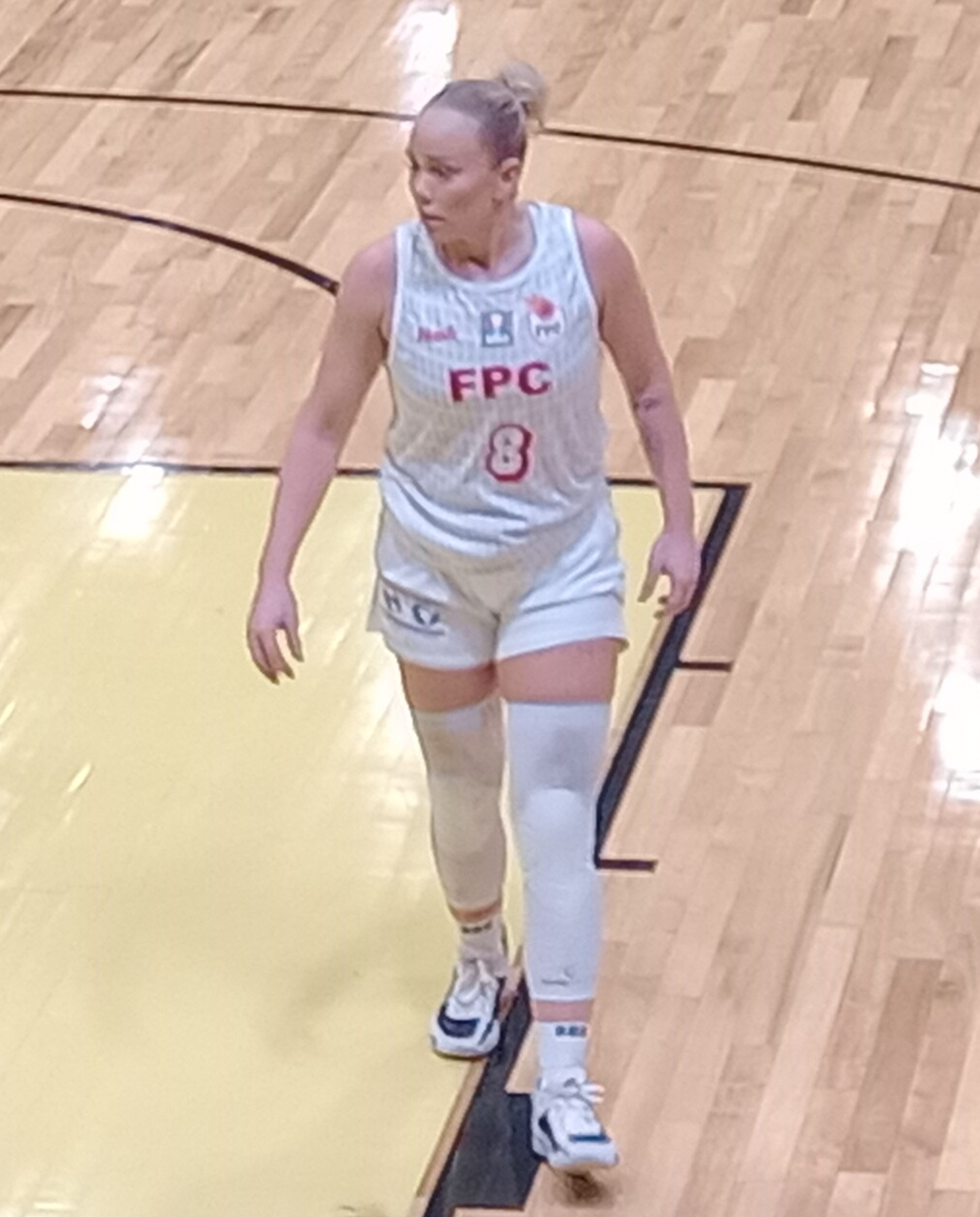
Jākobsone playing for Felix Perez at the 2023 WBLA
