= Israel Martín =

Spanish basketball coach

Personal information
- Born: 16 October 1974 (age 52) Santa Cruz de Tenerife, Spain

Career history

Coaching
- 2012–2013: CB Canarias (assistant)
- 2013–2014: Trepça
- 2014–2015: Tindastóll (m)
- 2015–2016: Bakken Bears
- 2016: Tindastóll (m, assistant)
- 2016–2019: Tindastóll (m)
- 2019–2021: Haukar
- 2021–2024: Sindri
- 2024–2026: Tindastóll (w)

Career highlights
- Úrvalsdeild karla Coach of the year (2015); Basketligaen Coach of the year (2016); Danish Cup (2016); Icelandic Cup (2018); Icelandic Super Cup (2018)

Israel Martín Concepción (born 16 October 1974) is a Spanish professional basketball coach. He won the Danish Cup in 2016 with the Bakken Bears and the Icelandic Cup in 2018 with Tindastóll.

== Coaching career ==
Martín was hired as the head coach of Tindastóll in 2014. He became the fourth foreign born coach to guide his team to the Úrvalsdeild karla finals when he led Tindastóll to then finals in 2015 where they lost to KR.

In May 2015, Martín was hired as the head coach of Bakken Bears of the Danish Basketligaen. With the Bears, Martín won the Danish Men's Basketball Cup and led the club to the Basketligaen finals where it lost to Horsens IC. After the season he was named the Basketligaen Coach of the year.

He returned to Tindastóll in August 2016 as the head coach of the club's junior programs and an assistant coach to José Maria Costa. In November 2016, Tindastóll and Costa parted ways and Martín was hired as his replacement. On January 13, 2018, he led Tindastóll to its first major trophy when it defeated KR in the Icelandic Cup finals. On April 13, 2018, he returned with Tindastóll to the Úrvalsdeild finals after defeating ÍR 3–1 in the semi-finals.

In May 2018, Martín was hired as the coach of the Icelandic men's national under-20 basketball team, replacing Arnar Guðjónsson. On 30 September, he won the Icelandic Super Cup after Tindastóll beat KR, 103–72. After losing to Þór Þorlákshöfn in the first round of the Úrvalsdeild playoffs, Martin stepped down from his post as head coach.

On 15 May 2019, Martín was announced as the new head coach of Haukar men's team. During his first season he led the team to a 11–10 record and a 6th-place finish. With one game left, the rest of the regular season and playoffs where canceled due to the coronavirus pandemic in Iceland. After a 3–11 start of the 2020–21 season, Haukar fired Martín on 16 March 2021.

On 13 June 2021, he was hired as the head coach of 1. deild karla club Sindri.

In June 2024, Martín was hired as the head coach of Tindastóll women's team following its promotion to Úrvalsdeild kvenna. He fired on 30 October 2026 after a 2-3 start.

== Awards, titles and accomplishments ==
=== Individual awards ===
- Basketligaen Coach of the year: 2016
- Úrvalsdeild karla Coach of the year: 2015

=== Titles ===
- Danish Men's Basketball Cup: 2016
- Icelandic Men's Basketball Cup: 2018
- Icelandic Men's Basketball Supercup: 2018

== Personal life ==
Martín is married to Brazilian former professional volleyball player Cristina Alves.
