= Páll Kolbeinsson =

Icelandic basketball player and coach

Personal information
- Born: 17 April 1964 (age 62) Iceland
- Listed height: 182 cm (6 ft 0 in)

Career information
- College: Wisconsin–Oshkosh (1984–1985, 1986–1989)
- Playing career: 1981–1998
- Position: Point guard
- Coaching career: 1990–2010

Career history

Playing
- 1981–1984: KR
- 1985–1986: KR
- 1989–1992: KR
- 1992–1996: Tindastóll
- 1998: Tindastóll

Coaching
- 1990–1991: KR
- 1994–1996: Tindastóll
- 1997–1998: Tindastóll
- 2009–2010: KR

Career highlights
- Icelandic Basketball Player of the Year (1990); Úrvalsdeild Domestic Player of the Year (1990); Úrvalsdeild Domestic All-First Team (1990); Icelandic League champion (1990); 2x Icelandic Basketball Cup (1984, 1991); Úrvalsdeild assists leader (1990)

Career Úrvalsdeild karla playing statistics
- Points: 2,078 (8.8 ppg)
- Games: 236

Career coaching record
- Úrvalsdeild karla: 72–62 (.537)

Páll Hermann Kolbeinsson (born 17 April 1964) is an Icelandic former basketball player and coach, and a former member of the Icelandic national team. He was named the Icelandic Basketball Player of the Year and Úrvalsdeild Domestic Player of the Year in 1990, the same year he won the Icelandic championship with KR. He played college basketball for University of Wisconsin–Oshkosh.

== Coaching career ==
Páll was hired as a player-coach for KR in 1990 and guided the team to the Icelandic Basketball Cup in 1991. He later served as a player-coach for Tindastóll. In 2010, he was hired as the head coach of KR. He stepped down as head coach following KR's loss to Snæfell in the semi-finals of the Úrvalsdeild playoffs on 15 April 2010.

== National team ==
Páll played 43 games for the Icelandic national team from 1986 to 1992.

== Awards, titles and accomplishments ==
=== Individual awards ===
- Icelandic Basketball Player of the Year: 1990
- Úrvalsdeild Domestic Player of the Year: 1990
- Úrvalsdeild Domestic All-First Team: 1990

=== Titles ===
- Icelandic champion: 1990
- Icelandic Basketball Cup (2): 1984, 1991

=== Accomplishments ===
Úrvalsdeild assists leader: 1990

== Personal life ==
Páll is the son of former Icelandic national team player Kolbeinn Pálsson. His aunt, Vigdís Pálsdóttir, played handball for Valur.
