= Björn Kristjánsson =

Icelandic basketball player

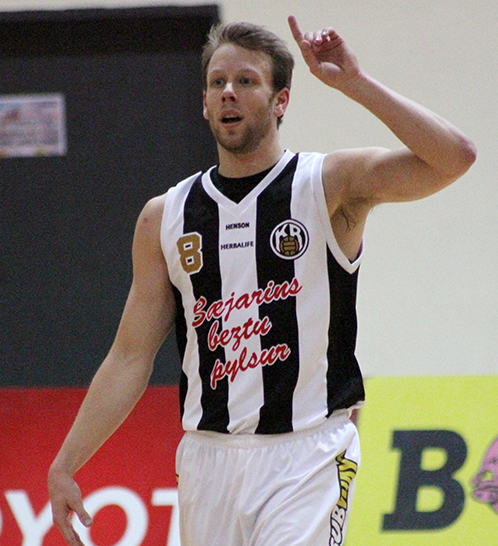
- Björn in 2015 with KR.

Valur
- League: Úrvalsdeild karla

Personal information
- Born: 4 November 1992 (age 34)
- Listed height: 188 cm (6 ft 2 in)

Career information
- Playing career: 2009–2022; 2024–present
- Position: Shooting guard

Career history
- 2009–2010: KR
- 2010–2011: FSu
- 2011–2012: KR
- 2012: Stjarnan
- 2013: ÍR
- 2013–2014: Breiðablik
- 2014–2016: KR
- 2016–2017: Njarðvík
- 2017–2022: KR
- 2024–2025: KR
- 2025–present: Valur

Career highlights
- 4× Úrvalsdeild karla champion (2015, 2016, 2018, 2019); 2× Icelandic Basketball Cup (2016, 2025); 2× Icelandic Super Cup (2014, 2015); Icelandic Company Cup (2014)

Björn Kristjánsson (born 4 November 1992) is an Icelandic basketball player. Over his career, he has won the Icelandic championship with KR four times and the Icelandic Basketball Cup twice.

== Playing career ==
Björn came up through the junior ranks of KR where he started his senior career in 2009. After a journeyman career during his first years, where he played for five teams in 5 years, Björn returned to KR in 2014 and helped the team win back-to-back national championships.

In October 2015, he was involved in a controversy after KR's chairman accused both Njarðvík and ÍR to have approached him while he was still under contract with KR which both the teams denied. After the 2015–2016 season, Björn signed with Njarðvík.

After spending the 2016–2017 season with Njarðvík, Björn returned to KR in June 2017. With him, KR won its 6th consecutive national championship in 2018. During the 2019 Úrvalsdeild finals, Björn was a big catalyst in KR's victory in game four which forced a decisive game five. In game 5, KR won its 7th consecutive national championship.

Due to a lingering hip injury, Björn was expected to miss the start of the 2019–20 season. In January 2020, KR announced that Björn would undergo a surgery and miss the rest of the season. In three games, he averaged 8.0 points and 2.0 assists per game.

On 22 November 2022, Björn announced his retirement from basketball due to a kidney disease that would require a kidney transplant. The following year, he received a kidney donated by his mother.

In December 2024, made a comeback with KR. In February 2025, Björn signed with KR's Reykjavík rivals Valur. On 22 March, he won the Icelandic Cup for the second time, after Valur defeated KR in the Cup finals, 96–78.

== Personal life ==
Björn's brother is basketball player Oddur Rúnar Kristjánsson.

In 2017, Björn was diagnosed with a degenerative kidney disease. In 2022, the disease had reached a stage where a kidney transplant was needed. Initially cleared to play the first half of the season, the disease limited him to two games and forcing him to announce his retirement in November 2022.
