= Pétur Rúnar Birgisson =

Icelandic basketball player (born 1996)

No. 7 – Tindastóll
- Position: Point guard
- League: Úrvalsdeild karla

Personal information
- Born: 20 February 1996 (age 30)
- Listed height: 185 cm (6 ft 1 in)

Career information
- Playing career: 2012–present

Career history
- 2012–present: Tindastóll

Career highlights
- Icelandic Cup MVP (2018); Úrvalsdeild Domestic All-First Team (2018); Úrvalsdeild Young Player of the Year (2015); Icelandic champion (2023); Icelandic Basketball Cup (2018); Icelandic Super Cup (2018); Icelandic D1 (2014)
Medals
Men's basketball
Representing Iceland
Games of the Small States of Europe
| Bronze medal – third place | 2017 San Marino | National Team |

Pétur Rúnar Birgisson (born 20 February 1996) is an Icelandic basketball player who plays for Tindastóll of the Úrvalsdeild karla. He won the Icelandic championship in 2023 and the Icelandic Cup in 2018 with Tindastóll.

== Career ==
=== Club career ===
Pétur had a stellar 2014–2015 season and helped Tindastóll to the 2015 Úrvalsdeild finals after averaging 7.8 assists in the semi-finals against Haukar. In the finals, Tindastóll lost to KR 3–1.

His stellar play continued in 2015-2016. He averaged 13.5 points and 6.0 assists in Tindastóls 3–1 victory against Keflavík in the first round of the playoffs. He was however unable to prevent Tindastóll from losing to Haukar in the semi-finals, 3–1.

On 13 January 2018 he helped Tindastóll to its first major title when they beat KR in Icelandic Basketball Cup finals. In the game he had 22 points, 8 assists and 7 rebounds, and was named as the Cup finals MVP.

On 4 May 2018 Pétur was named to the Úrvalsdeild Karla Domestic All-First Team. On 30 September, he won the Icelandic Super Cup after Tindastóll beat KR, 103–72.

In 2023, he won his first Icelandic championship after Tindastóll defeated Valur 3–2 in a finals rematch from the previous year.

=== Icelandic national team ===
In May 2017, Pétur was named to the Icelandic national team for the 2017 Games of the Small States of Europe where he helped Iceland finish third. In July 2017, he was among the 24 players selected for the national team training camp prior to EuroBasket 2017. He was not named to the twelve man roster for Eurobasket. As of 2018 he has played five games for the national team.

== Awards, titles and accomplishments ==
=== Individual awards ===
- Úrvalsdeild Karla Domestic All-First Team: 2018
- Icelandic Cup MVP: 2018
- Úrvalsdeild Karla Young Player of the Year: 2015

=== Titles ===
- Icelandic champion: 2023
- Icelandic Basketball Cup: 2018
- Icelandic Super Cup: 2018
- Icelandic Company Cup: 2012
- Icelandic D1: 2014
