= Collin Pryor =

American-Icelandic basketball player

No. 50 – Álftanes
- Position: Forward
- League: Úrvalsdeild karla

Personal information
- Born: March 15, 1990 (age 36) St. Charles, Illinois, U.S.
- Listed height: 1.98 m (6 ft 6 in)
- Listed weight: 95 kg (209 lb)

Career information
- High school: St. Charles East (St. Charles, Illinois)
- College: Northern State (2008–2013)
- Playing career: 2013–present
- Coaching career: 2014–present

Career history

Playing
- 2013–2015: Selfoss
- 2015–2017: Fjölnir
- 2017–2019: Stjarnan
- 2019–2025: ÍR
- 2025–2026: Selfoss
- 2026–present: Álftanes

Coaching
- 2014–2015: FSu/Hrunamenn

Career highlights
- As player: Icelandic Cup winner (2019); NSIC All-First Team (2013)

Collin Anthony Pryor (born 15 March 1990) is an American-Icelandic professional basketball player for Álftanes of the Úrvalsdeild karla. He debuted for the Iceland national basketball team in 2018. In 2019, he won the Icelandic Cup as a member of Stjarnan.

== Early life ==
Pryor attended St. Charles East High School in Illinois, graduating in 2008.

== College career ==
Pryor played college basketball for Northern State University, who were led by head coach Paul Sather. After redshirting his first year, he moved to the starting lineup as a freshman and averaged 10.8 points and 5.8 rebounds a game. He was a first-team all-conference selection as a sophomore, after averaging 15.2 points and 8.5 rebounds a game. Injuries hampered him during his junior season but he bounced back during his senior season, averaging team leading 16.2 points and 7.7 rebounds a game.

== Playing career ==
Pryor's first professional stop was with 1. deild karla club FSu in 2013. He averaged a team leading 28.6 points and 14.2 rebounds, but the team missed out on the playoffs on the last day of the regular season. He re-signed with the club for the 2014–2015 season and averaged 24.0 points and 13.6 rebounds, this time leading FSu to a 3rd-place finish and a spot in the promotion playoffs. FSu knocked out Valur in the first-round and faced Hamar in a best-of-three series where the winner would be promoted to the top-tier Úrvalsdeild karla. After losing the first game, FSu finished strong by winning the next two games, and the series, with Pryor scoring a team leading 24 points in the third and deciding game.

Although FSu went up, Pryor stayed in the 1. deild, signing with Fjölnir. He played two years for the club, helping them to the promotion playoffs both times. In 2017, he signed with Úrvalsdeild karla club Stjarnan. As Pryor had lived for four years in the country, Stjarnan had hoped that he would receive an exemption from the Icelandic Basketball Federation to play as a domestic player. The exemption was not granted and Pryor split his playing time with other Americans on the team, and averaged 13.3 points and 6.6 rebounds in 22 minutes per game during the regular season. In four playoffs games, he averaged 15.3 points and 6.3 rebounds in 28 minutes per game.

On 17 February 2019, Pryor had 9 points and 5 rebounds in Stjarnan's 84–68 victory against Njarðvík in the Icelandic Cup finals. In July 2019, Pryor left Stjarnan.

In August 2019, Pryor signed with Úrvalsdeild runner-up ÍR. In his first season with ÍR, he averaged 16.7 points and 5.4 rebounds per game before the last regular-season game and all the playoffs were canceled due to the coronavirus pandemic in Iceland. Following the season, he signed a one-year contract extension. During the 2020–21 season, he averaged 18.0 points and 6.0 rebounds per game but ÍR missed the playoffs with a loss in the last game of the season.

After spending the 2025–2026 season with Selfoss, he signed with Álftanes in end of May 2026.

== National team career ==
Pryor received an Icelandic citizenship in July 2018. On 23 August 2018, he was selected to the 24-man training camp of the Icelandic national basketball team prior to its upcoming games in the EuroBasket 2021 qualification. On 1 September 2018, he was selected to the team for its upcoming games against Norway. He started in his first game for Iceland on 2 September, scoring 10 points and grabbing 10 rebounds in a 71–69 victory against Norway. On 13 September he was named to the 12 man roster for the EuroBasket qualification game against Portugal.
