= Nikolas Tomsick =

American-Croatian basketball player (born 1991)

Nicholas Tomsick
Personal information
- Born: 26 February 1991 (age 35) Denver, Colorado
- Listed height: 188 cm (6 ft 2 in)
- Listed weight: 86 kg (190 lb)

Career information
- High school: Broomfield (Broomfield, Colorado); Chaparral (Scottsdale, Arizona)
- College: North Platte CC (2010–2012); Fort Lewis (2012–2014)
- Playing career: 2014–present
- Position: Point guard

Career history
- 2014–2015: BBG Herford
- 2016–2017: KK Zabok
- 2017: Plymouth Raiders
- 2018: KK Vrijednosnice Osijek
- 2018–2019: Þór Þorlákshöfn
- 2019–2020: Stjarnan
- 2020–2021: Tindastóll
- 2021: KB Prishtina
- 2022: Olomoucko Prostejov
- 2022–2024: Kortrijk Spurs
- 2024: Donar Groningen
- 2024: Caledonia Gladiators
- 2024: Abejas de León
- 2024–2025: Þór Þorlákshöfn
- 2025: Abejas de León
- 2025: Gambusinos de Fresnillo
- 2025–2026: Caballeros de Culiacán

Career highlights
- Icelandic Cup (2020); Icelandic Super Cup (2019); Úrvalsdeild assist leader (2019); TDM1 winner (2023)

Nicholas Tomsick (born 26 February 1991) is an American-Croatian professional basketball player. In 2019, he led the Icelandic Úrvalsdeild karla in assists while playing for Þór Þorlákshöfn. He became well known for his clutch performances in close games in the Úrvalsdeild, hitting several game winning shots at the buzzer for both Þór and Stjarnan.

== College career ==
Tomsick played two seasons at North Platte Community College from 2010 to 2012. As a sophomore he led the NJCAA Region 9 and ranked third in the nation in scoring at 22.3 points per game and was named to the All-conference first team and All-NJCAA Region IX Tournament Team. In 2012, he transferred to Fort Lewis where he averaged 17.3 points in 57 games from 2012 to 2014.

== Professional career ==
After starting his professional career in Germany with BBG Herford, Tomsick went on to play for KK Zabok, Plymouth Raiders and KK Vrijednosnice Osijek before signing with Þór Þorlákshöfn in the Úrvalsdeild karla in July 2018.

On 15 November 2018, Tomsick scored 41 points and made 8 three point shots, including a game winning buzzer beater, against Breiðablik. On 3 February 2019, Tomsick scored the game winning three point shot against ÍR. Regarded as one of the best players in the league during the regular season, he averaged 22.9 points and led the league, tied with Ægir Steinarsson, with 7.5 assists per game. During the playoffs, he was a big catalyst in Þór's unexpected advance to the semi-finals where the team bowed out against eventual champions KR.

In July 2019, Tomsick signed with Stjarnan. Stjarnan opened the 2019–20 season with a 89–77 win against reigning champions KR in the annual Icelandic Super Cup where Tomsick posted 13 points and 6 assists. On 1 November, he scored a game winning buzzer beater against Njarðvík, giving Stjarnan 78–76 victory. On 20 November, Tomsick scored 44 points, include the game winning three pointer at the buzzer, in a 101–104 victory against Þór Akureyri. Tomsick, who battled illness during the game and threw up on the sideline during half-time, made 11 out of 17 three point shots during the game. On 15 February 2020, Tomsick scored 19 points in Stjarnan's 75–89 win against Grindavík in the Icelandic Cup finals. For the season he averaged a team leading 20.1 points along with 5.1 assists.

On 14 April 2020, Tomsick signed with Tindastóll, meeting his former Þór Þorlákshöfn coach Baldur Þór Ragnarsson.

In 2022, Tomsick signed with Kortrijk Spurs. In May 2023, he helped the club win the second tier Top Division Men One.

In December 2024, Tomsick returned to the Úrvalsdeild karla and signed back with Þór Þorlákshöfn.
