= Zvonko Buljan =

Croatian basketball player

Personal information
- Born: February 6, 1987 (age 39) Split, Croatia
- Listed height: 2.06 m (6 ft 9 in)

Career information
- College: Vincennes (2006–2008); TCU (2008–2010)
- NBA draft: 2010: undrafted
- Playing career: 2005–present
- Position: Power forward

Career history
- 2005–2006: Split
- 2010: APOEL
- 2010–2011: PAOK
- 2011–2012: Telekom Bonn
- 2012–2013: Körmend
- 2013–2014: Krka
- 2014–2015: Kolossos Rodou
- 2015: Feni Industries
- 2015: Naft Abadan
- 2015: Split
- 2016: Shahrdari Arak
- 2017: Shahrdari Kashan
- 2017: Hoops Club
- 2017: Estudiantes Concordia
- 2018: Union Neuchâtel
- 2018: Okapi Aalstar
- 2018: BCM U Pitești
- 2019–2020: Al Dhafra
- 2020: Njarðvík
- 2021: ÍR
- 2022–present: Al-Ittihad SC

Career highlights
- Slovenian championship (2014); Slovenian Basketball Cup (2014)

Zvonko Buljan (born 6 February 1987) is a Croatian professional basketball power forward. A well traveled player, he has played in over ten countries, including in the Greek Basket League and the German Basketball Bundesliga. In 2014, he won both the Slovenian championship and the Slovenian Basketball Cup.

== Playing career ==
=== College career ===
Buljan played college basketball for Vincennes University from 2006 to 2008. He then transferred to Texas Christian University where he played two seasons for the TCU Horned Frogs. In two seasons for the Horned Frogs, he averaged 12.2 points and 8.2 rebounds in 62 games.

=== Iceland ===
In September 2020, Buljan signed with Njarðvík of the Icelandic Úrvalsdeild karla. In his first game, on 3 October, he had 25 points and 11 rebounds in a 92–80 win against defending champions KR. Four days later, he was suspended for three games by the Icelandic Basketball Association for grabbing the genital area of an opposing player during the game. On 29 November 2020, Njarðvík announced that it had released Buljan on his own request due to the Coronavirus pandemic in Iceland. In January 2021, he signed with Úrvalsdeildar club ÍR. With ÍR, he averaged 19.4 points, 7.3 rebounds and 3.1 assists per game.
