= Paul Jones (basketball) =

American basketball player (born 1989)

Personal information
- Born: July 3, 1989 (age 37) Kent, Washington
- Listed height: 6 ft 4 in (1.93 m)
- Listed weight: 193 lb (88 kg)

Career information
- High school: Kent-Meridian (Kent, Washington)
- College: Whatcom CC (2009–2011); Western Washington (2011–2013)
- NBA draft: 2013: undrafted
- Playing career: 2013–present
- Position: Small forward

Career history
- 2013–2014: Hub Jets
- 2014–2015: Bohemios Montevideo
- 2015: Mineros de Caborca
- 2015–2016: Ironi Ashkelon
- 2016: Aries Trikla
- 2017: Águilas Doradas de Durango
- 2017–2018: Haukar
- 2018: Stjarnan

Career highlights
- First-team All-GNAC (2013)

Paul Anthony Jones III (born July 3, 1989) is an American professional basketball player. Standing at 1.98 m (6 ft 6 in), he plays the small forward position. After two years at Whatcom Community College and Western Washington College each, Jones entered the 2013 NBA draft but was not selected in the draft's two rounds.

== High school career ==
Jones played high school basketball at Kent-Meridian High School, in Kent, Washington.

== College career ==
Jones played college basketball at Whatcom Community College from 2009 to 2011 and at Western Washington University with Western Washington Vikings each from 2011 to 2013.

== Professional career ==
On October 8, Jones signed with Haukar of the Icelandic Úrvalsdeild karla. In 30 games for Haukar, Jones averaged 18.2 points and 7.3 rebounds, helping them to the best record during the regular season and a trip to the semi-finals in the playoffs, where they lost to eventual champions KR.

In August 2018, Jones signed with Stjarnan of the Úrvalsdeild karla. After a disappointing start for Stjarnan, who were predicted as the favorites to win the national championship prior to the season, Jones was released in December in a roster overhaul. In 10 games for Stjarnan, he was the team's leading scorer with 20.2 points per game while also averaging 7.1 rebounds and shooting 40.0% from the three-point range.

In August 2021, Jones signed with Haukar. In end of September 2021, it was reported that he would to play for the team in the upcoming season.
