= Kjalarnes =

Coordinates: 64.2406°N 21.8364°W

- District
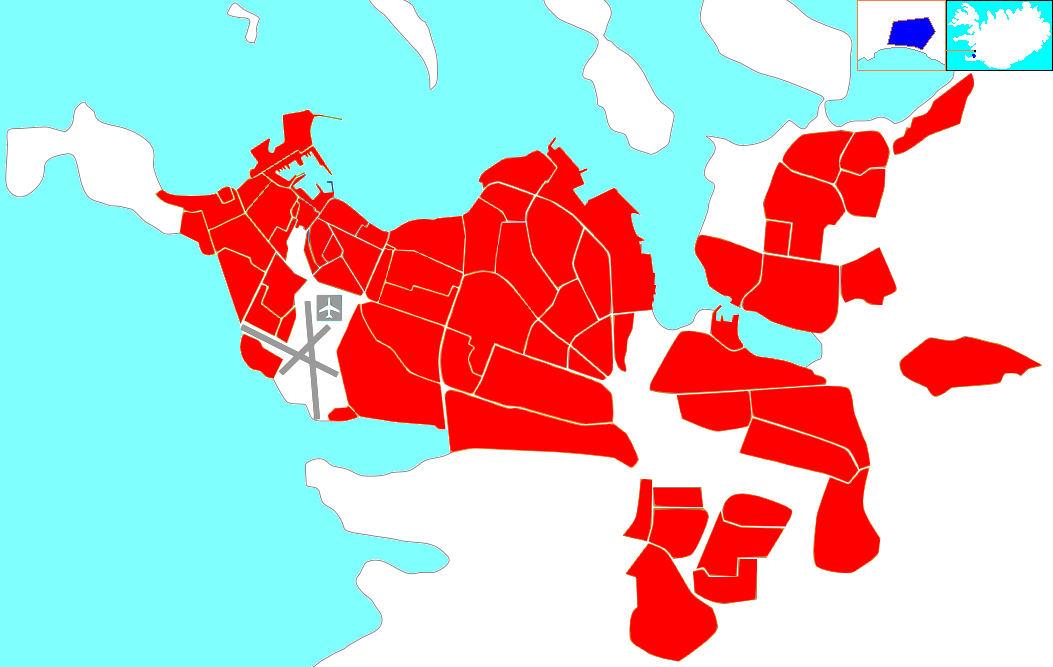
- Country: Iceland
- Municipality: Reykjavík

Area
  - District: 61.7 km^{2} (23.8 sq mi)
  - Urban: 0.4 km^{2} (0.15 sq mi)

Population (2010)
  - District: 830
  - Density: 13/km^{2} (35/sq mi)
- Postal code: IS-116

Kjalarnes (Icelandic pronunciation: [ˈcʰaːlarˌnɛːs]) is the least populous district in the municipality of Reykjavík, the capital of Iceland, with a population of around 600 inhabitants. It occupies a peninsula extending into Faxaflói Bay, south of the mouth of Hvalfjörður.

== Overview ==
Kjalarnes was an independent municipality, until it joined Reykjavík in 1998. It takes about 18 kilometers to drive from Kjalarnes to Reykjavík and it takes 13 kilometers to drive from Kjalarnes to Mosfellsbær. The mountain Esja is located in Kjalarnes.
