= Emil Barja =

Icelandic basketball player (born 1991)

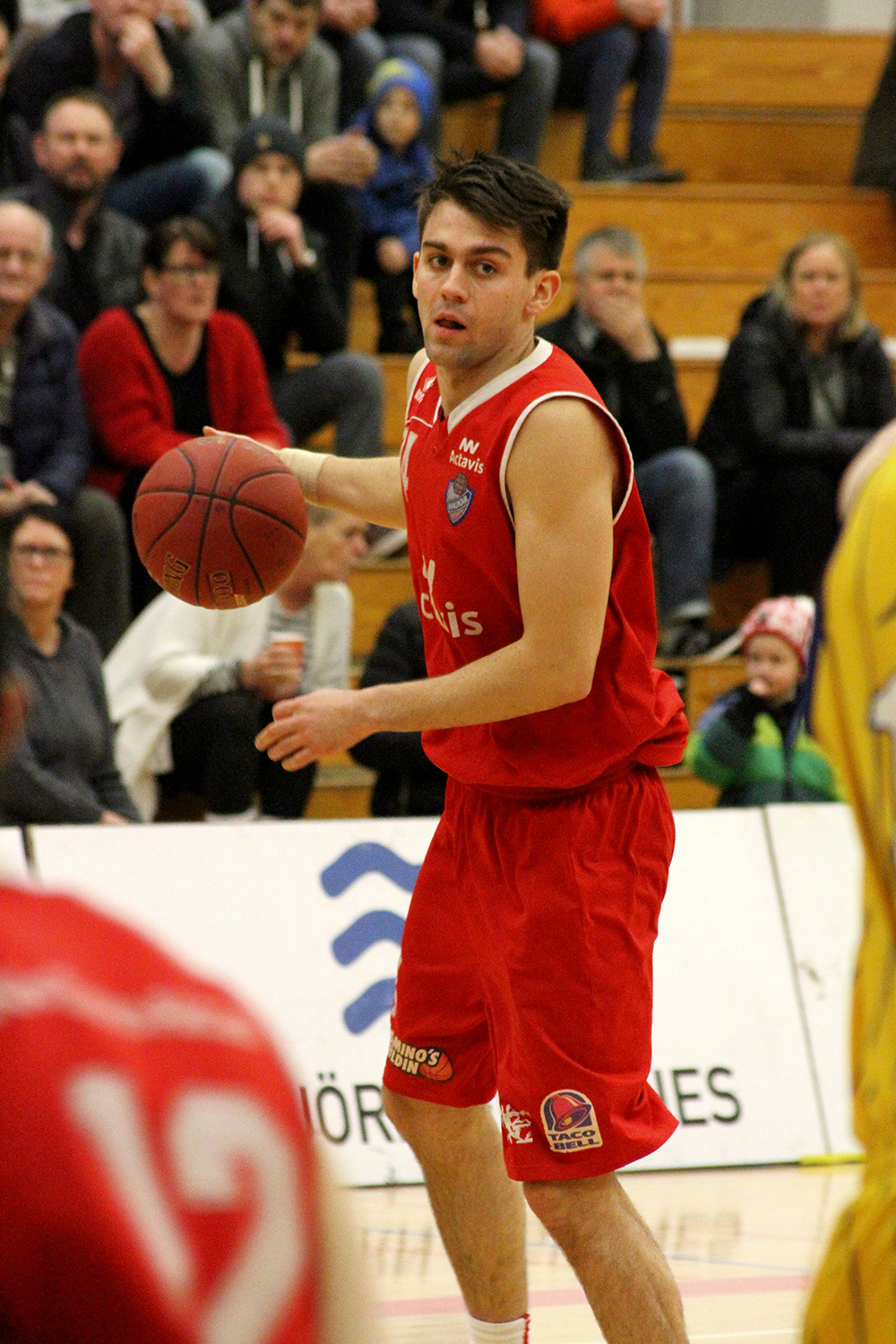
- Emil with Haukar in 2015

Stjarnan
- Title: Head coach
- League: Úrvalsdeild karla

Personal information
- Born: 16 August 1991 (age 35)
- Listed height: 192 cm (6 ft 4 in)
- Listed weight: 80 kg (176 lb)

Career information
- Playing career: 2007–2023
- Position: Point guard
- Coaching career: 2024–present

Career history

Playing
- 2007–2018: Haukar
- 2018–2019: KR
- 2019–2023: Haukar

Coaching
- 2024: Haukar (w, assistant)
- 2024–2026: Haukar (w)
- 2024: Haukar (m, interim)
- 2026–present: Stjarnan (m)

Career highlights
- As player: Úrvalsdeild karla champion (2019); 2× 1. deild karla (2013, 2022); As coach: Úrvalsdeild kvenna champion (2025); Úrvalsdeild kvenna Coach of the Year

Emil Barja (born 16 August 1991) is an Icelandic basketball coach and former player. He won the Icelandic championship in 2019 as a member of KR.

== Career ==
Emil came up through junior ranks of Haukar and played his first senior games during the 2007–2008 season. In 2013, he helped Haukar win 1. deild karla and gain promotion to Úrvalsdeild karla.

Emil had his best statistical season in 2013–2014, averaging 9.9 points, 8.0 rebounds and 6.9 assists. In 2014–2015, he finished second in the league in assists, behind Pavel Ermolinskij, with 7.0 assists per game, while also posting 10.9 points and 6.9 rebounds per game, and was named to the Úrvalsdeild All-first team for the second half of the season. Haukar finished with the third best record in the league and made it to the semi-finals where they lost to Tindastóll 3–1.

He averaged 9.2 points and 5.6 assists in 2016–2017 in a disappointing season for Haukar who avoided relegation by winning their last three games.

During the 2017–2018 season, Emil helped Haukar post the best record in the league for the first time in its history. On 19 July 2018, Emil left Haukar, where he had trained since the age of six, and signed a two-year contract with reigning national champions KR. On 4 May 2019 he won his first national championship after KR beat ÍR in the Úrvalsdeild finals 3–2.

In May 2019, Emil returned to Haukar, signing a two-year contract.

== National team career ==
On 1 September 2018, he was selected to the Icelandic national team for its upcoming games against Norway. He played his first game for Iceland on 2 September, posting 2 points, 9 rebounds and 6 assists in a 71–69 victory against Norway.

== Coaching career ==
In January 2024, Emil was hired as an assistant coach to Haukar women's team. In May 2024, he was promoted to head coach, replacing Ingvar Guðjónsson.

In December 2024, he took over Haukar men's team on an interim basis following the resignation of Maté Dalmay.

In March 2025, he was named the Úrvalsdeild kvenna Coach of the Year after leading Haukar to the best record in the league.

On 28 May 2026 Emil was hired as the head coach of Stjarnan men's team.
