= Brandon Nazione =

American basketball player (born 1994)

Personal information
- Born: March 31, 1994 (age 32) Howell, Michigan
- Listed height: 2.03 m (6 ft 8 in)
- Listed weight: 101 kg (223 lb)

Career information
- College: Des Moines Area CC (2012–2014); EMU (2014–2016)
- NBA draft: 2016: undrafted
- Position: Center

Career history
- 2016–2017: Bayer Giants Leverkusen
- 2017–2018: Gimnasia y Esgrima
- 2018–2019: Olimpia Montevideo
- 2019: Sporting CP
- 2021: KR
- 2021–2022: Club Atlético Olimpia
- 2022–2023: Stella Azzurra Roma
- 2024: Mineros de Zacatecas

Brandon Joseph Nazione (born March 31, 1994) is an American-Italian professional basketball player.

== College career ==
Nazione played college basketball for Des Moines Area Community College and Eastern Michigan University.

== Professional career ==
In 2016, Nazione signed with Bayer Giants Leverkusen. The following season he signed with Gimnasia y Esgrima in Argentina.

Nazione played for Sporting CP in the first half of the 2019–2020 season.

In January 2021, Nazione signed in Iceland with Úrvalsdeild karla club KR.
