= Körfuknattleiksfélag Selfoss =

Icelandic basketball club

- Leagues: (M) 1. deild karla
- Founded: August 24, 2005
- History: Íþróttafélag FSu; 2005–2010; Körfuknattleiksfélag FSu; 2010–2018; Körfuknattleiksfélag Selfoss; 2018–present
- Arena: Iða
- Location: Selfoss, Iceland
- Team colors: Black, White
- President: Gylfi Þorkelsson
- Head coach: Árni Þór Hilmarsson
- Affiliation: Real Betis
- Website: selfosskarfa.is
Home	Away

Körfuknattleiksfélag Selfoss, commonly known as Selfoss-Basket (Icelandic: Selfoss-Karfa), is a basketball club in Selfoss, Iceland. Its men's team currently plays in the 1. deild karla.

== History ==
The club was founded on August 24, 2005 as Íþróttafélag FSu (English: FSu Sports Club). In 2012 it changed its name to Körfuknattleiksfélag FSu (English: FSu Basket) and on April 5, 2018, the club changed its name again to Körfuknattleiksfélag Selfoss (English: Selfoss Basketball Club), or Selfoss-Karfa (English: Selfoss-Basket) for short.

== Men's basketball ==
In 2008, FSu gained promotion to the Úrvalsdeild karla after beating Valur in the 1. deild karla promotion playoffs. It played in the Úrvalsdeild until 2010, when it was relegated back to 1. deild. In 2015, FSu beat Hamar in the promotion playoffs and gained promotion to the Úrvalsdeild karla for the second time in its history. During the 2015–16 Úrvalsdeild karla season they posted a 3-19 record, finishing second-to-last in the league and were relegated back to 1. deild. In February 2021, the team made an affiliation deal with Real Betis.

=== Notable players ===
Note: Flags indicate national team eligibility at FIBA-sanctioned events. Players may hold other non-FIBA nationalities not displayed.

Criteria

To appear in this section a player must have either:

- Set a club record or won an individual award while at the club
- Played at least one official international match for their national team at any time
- Played at least one official NBA match at any time.

- (Iceland) Björn Kristjánsson
- (Iceland) Brynjar Karl Sigurðsson
- (Iceland) Collin Pryor
- (England) Chris Caird
- (Iceland) Daníel Guðni Guðmundsson
- (Iceland) Hafþór Júlíus Björnsson
- (United States) Tony Wroten
- (Iceland) Tómas Þórður Hilmarsson
- (Iceland) Valur Orri Valsson

=== Coaches ===
- (Iceland) Brynjar Karl Sigurðsson 2005–2009
- (United States) Rob Newson 2009–2010
- (Iceland) Valur Ingimundarson 2010–2011
- (Iceland) Kjartan Atli Kjartansson 2011–2012
- (United States) Erik Olson 2012–2016
- (Spain) Eloy Doce Chambrelan 2016–2017
- (Iceland) Karl Ágúst Hannibalsson 2017–2018
- (England) Chris Caird 2018–2023
- (Iceland) Árni Þór Hilmarsson 2023–present

== Women's basketball ==
The club fielded a joint women's team with neighbouring club Hrunamenn in the second-tier 1. deild kvenna, under the name FSu/Hrunamenn, from 2013 to 2015.

=== Coaches ===
- Karl Ágúst Hannibalsson 2013–2014
- Collin Pryor 2014–2015
- Berglind Karen Ingvarsdóttir 2025–2026
