= Raise the Bar (film) =

2021 Icelandic documentary film by Guðjón Ragnarsson

- Hækkum rána
- Directed by: Guðjón Ragnarsson
- Written by: Iikka Vehkalathi
- Produced by: Margrét Jónasdóttir
- Starring: Brynjar Karl Sigurðsson
- Cinematography: Guðjón Ragnarsson; Tómas Marshall
- Edited by: Ingibjörg Ásmundsdóttir; Jakob Halldórsson
- Music by: Ragga Gísla; Pétur Jónsson
- Production companies: Sagafilm; Pystymetsä Oy
- Release date: 10 February 2021
- Running time: 70 minutes
- Country: Iceland
- Language: Icelandic

Raise the Bar (Icelandic: Hækkum rána) is an Icelandic documentary about the controversial journey of a girls basketball team under the direction of coach Brynjar Karl Sigurðsson.

The film was released at the Sjónvarp Síminn Premium streaming service on 10 February 2021 and immediately raised a controversy in Iceland due to Brynjar's coaching methods.

== Premises ==
The film follows the journey of the a girls basketball team under the direction of coach Brynjar Karl Sigurðsson and their quest to be allowed to compete in boys tournaments.

== Accolades ==
At the 2021 International Film Festival for Young Audiences, Filem'on, Raise the Bar won the award for best documentary.
