= Arnar Guðjónsson =

Icelandic basketball player and coach

Tindastóll
- Position: Head coach
- League: Úrvalsdeild karla

Personal information
- Born: 17 June 1986 (age 40) Reykjavík, Iceland
- Coaching career: 2005–present

Career history

Playing
- 2005–2007: Sindri
- 2009: Skallagrímur

Coaching
- 2005–2007: Sindri
- 2007–2009: FSu (assistant)
- 2009–2011: Aabyhøj (assistant)
- 2011–2013: Aabyhøj
- 2011–2018: Iceland (assistant)
- 2013–2015: Svendborg Rabbits (assistant)
- 2015–2017: Svendborg Rabbits
- 2018–2024: Stjarnan (M)
- 2022–?: Denmark (assistant)
- 2023–2024: Stjarnan (W)
- 2025–present: Tindastóll (M)

Career highlights
- As head coach: 3x Icelandic Cup (2019, 2020, 2022); 2x Icelandic Super Cup (2019, 2020); As assistant coach: Danish Cup (2014)

Arnar Guðjónsson (Icelandic pronunciation: [ˈa(r)tnar̥ ˈkvʏðˌjounsɔn]; born 17 June 1986) is an Icelandic basketball coach. He is currently the head coach of Stjarnan men's basketball team and a former assistant coach of the Icelandic men's national basketball team.

== Playing career ==
Arnar played one season in the Icelandic top-tier Úrvalsdeild karla with Skallagrímur, appearing in 8 games and averaging 1.9 points and 1.9 rebounds per game.

== Coaching career ==
Arnar started his coaching career with Sindri in 2005 and coached there for two years before moving to FSu to serve as an assistant to Brynjar Karl Sigurðsson. In 2009, he moved to Denmark and was joined Aabyhoj where he was an assistant coach for two years before taking over the head coaching responsibilities.

In 2013, Arnar was hired as an assistant coach to Svendborg Rabbits. In November 2015, he took over as head coach of Svendborg when Craig Pedersen resigned. In April 2017, he guided the club to bronze in the league after beating SISU 87–72 in the third-place game. In May, 2017, Arnar left Svendborg after his contract was not renewed.

On April 6, 2018, Arnar was hired as the head coach of Stjarnan men's team.Tindastóll A month later, he resigned from Icelandic national teams to fully focus on his duties at Stjarnan.

In January 2019, he received a one-game suspension for storming onto the court during live play to protest a non-call. On 17 February 2019, Arnar guided Stjarnan to an 84–68 victory against Njarðvík in the Icelandic Cup finals.

Stjarnan opened the 2019–20 season with an 89–77 win against reigning champions KR in the annual Icelandic Super Cup. On 15 February 2020, he guided Stjarnan to its second straight Icelandic Cup victory.

On 27 September 2020, Arnar led Stjarnan to win in the Super Cup for the second consecutive season.

On 19 March 2022, he won his third Icelandic Basketball Cup when Stjarnan defeated reigning national champions Þór Þorlákshöfn in the 2022 Cup Finals.

In October 2022, Arnar was hired as an assistant coach to Allan Foss with the Denmark men's national team.

In January 2023, Arnar guided Stjarnan to its fifth appearance in a row in the Iceland Cup finals.

On 13 December 2023, he was made the head coach of Stjarnan women's team following the departure of Auður Íris Ólafsdóttir.

At the end of the 2023–24 season, he stepped down from both of Stjarnan's teams and took a job at the Icelandic Basketball Association.

In June 2025, he was hired as the head coach of Tindastóll.
