= Tindastóll (women's basketball) =

Icelandic basketball team

- Leagues: 1. deild kvenna
- Arena: Síkið
- Location: Sauðárkrókur, Iceland
- Website: tindastoll.is
Home	Away

The Tindastóll women's basketball team, commonly known as Tindastóll, is the women's basketball department of the Ungmennafélagið Tindastóll sport club and is based in Sauðárkrókur, Iceland.

== History ==
Tindastóll played in the top-tier Úrvalsdeild kvenna from 1992 to 1996 and again during the 1999–2000 season, making the playoffs in 1994 and 2000. In 2024, the team was promoted to the Úrvalsdeild again.

== Trophies and awards ==
=== Titles ===
- Division I (2):
  - 1998, 1999

=== Awards ===
Úrvalsdeild Women's Young Player of the Year

- Birna Eiríksdóttir – 2000

1. deild Foreign Player of the Year

- Tessondra Williams – 2019

1. deild Domestic All-First team

- Bríet Lilja Sigurðardóttir – 2015

== Notable players ==
Note: Flags indicate national team eligibility at FIBA-sanctioned events. Players may hold other non-FIBA nationalities not displayed.

Criteria

To appear in this section a player must have either:

- Set a club record or won an individual award while at the club
- Played at least one official international match for their national team at any time
- Played at least one official NBA match at any time.

- (Iceland) Birna Eiríksdóttir
- (Iceland) Birna Valgarðsdóttir
- (Iceland) Inga Dóra Magnúsdóttir
- (Iceland) Kolbrún María Ármannsdóttir
- (Iceland) Kristín Elfa Magnúsdóttir
- (Argentina) Macarena D'Urso
- (Argentina) Florencia Chagas
- (Latvia) Ilze Jākobsone
- (Senegal) Oumoul Sarr

== Coaches ==
- (Iceland) Kári Marísson 1992–1996
- (United States) Jill Wilson 1999–2000
- (Lithuania) Arnoldas Kuncaitis 2018–2019
- (Iceland) Árni Eggert Harðarson 2019–2021
- (Slovenia) Jan Bezica 2021–2022
- (Sweden) Patrick Ryan 2022–2023
- (Iceland) Helgi Freyr Margeirsson 2023–2024
- (Spain) Israel Martín 2024–2026
- (Iceland) Hlynur Freyr Einarsson 2026–present
