= Brynjar Karl Sigurðsson =

Icelandic business man, basketball coach and former player

Aþena
- Title: Head coach
- League: 1. deild kvenna

Personal information
- Born: 17 September 1973 (age 53) Reykjavík, Iceland
- Listed height: 190 cm (6 ft 3 in)
- Listed weight: 82 kg (181 lb)

Career information
- High school: Assumption High School
- College: UAM (1998–1999)
- Playing career: 1989–2001; 2009
- Position: Forward

Career history

Playing
- 1989–1991: ÍR
- 1992: Valur
- 1992–1993: Breiðablik
- 1993–1994: Valur
- 1994–1995: ÍA
- 1995–1996: Valur
- 1996–1997: ÍA
- 1997–1998: Valur
- 1999–2000: ÍA
- 2000: Valur
- 2001: ÍA
- 2009: FSu

Coaching
- 2001: ÍA
- 2005–2009: FSu
- 2021–present: Aþena

Career Úrvalsdeild karla statistics
- Points: 2,115 (13.1 ppg)
- Rebounds: 437 (4.0 rpg)
- Games: 162

Brynjar Karl Sigurðsson (born 17 September 1973) is an Icelandic businessman, basketball coach and former player. He played several seasons in the Icelandic top-tier Úrvalsdeild karla and was a member of the Icelandic national team. Following his basketball career, he founded the company Sideline Sports which designed coaching software used by the Premier League, NBA and the NFL. A controversial figure in Iceland, he has been scrutinized for his coaching methods and fight with the Icelandic Basketball Association to let his junior women's team compete in boys tournaments. In February 2021, the documentary Raise the bar which follows him and his girls teams, premiered in Iceland.

== Early life ==
Brynjar was born in Breiðholt, Reykjavík in 1973. He started training basketball at the age of 9.

== Basketball career ==
=== Club career ===
Brynjar spent most of his career with Valur and ÍA. In 1996, he was slated to play for freshly promoted KFÍ during the 1996–97 season but he eventually signed back with ÍA. In January 2001, Brynjar transferred from Valur to ÍA, which by then was playing in the second-tier 1. deild karla. He appeared in four games the rest of the season, averaging 27.3 points per game. The following season, he averaged 32.2 points in five games as a player-coach. He resigned in December the same year due to unpaid salary from the club.

In 2009, Brynjar had a short comeback in with FSu, for whom he was the head coach, when he scored 20 points in a loss against Snæfell.

=== National team career ===
Brynjar played 11 games for the Icelandic national team from 1994 to 1995.

=== Coaching career ===
In May 2001, Brynjar was hired as a player-coach for ÍA. He resigned in December the same year due to unpaid salary. In 2005, he founded the FSu basketball academy in Selfoss. In 2008, he guided the team to promotion to the top-tier Úrvalsdeild karla after beating Valur in the 1. deild karla promotion playoffs.

In 2021, he became the head coach of 1. deild kvenna club Aþena. In 2024, he guided the team to promotion to the top-tier Úrvalsdeild kvenna for the first time.

== Handball career ==
In 2011, Brynjar was selected to Valur's roster for its game against Akureyri in the Icelandic Handball Cup finals despite never having played professional handball before. The game plan was for him to see spot minutes as a defender in the first half but due to Valur playing a man short for an extended amount of time, he eventually did not see any playing time in Valur's 26–24 win.

== Executive career ==
In October 2021, Brynjar was announced as the new chairman of Leiknir's basketball department.
