= Baldur Þór Ragnarsson =

Icelandic basketball coach (born 1990)

Álftanes
- Title: Head coach
- League: Úrvalsdeild karla

Personal information
- Born: 23 February 1990 (age 36)
- Listed height: 183 cm (6 ft 0 in)
- Listed weight: 76 kg (168 lb)

Career information
- Playing career: 2006–2017
- Position: Point guard
- Number: 4
- Coaching career: 2015–present

Career history

Playing
- 2006–2017: Þór Þorlákshöfn

Coaching
- 2015–2018: Þór Þorlákshöfn (assistant)
- 2018–2019: Þór Þorlákshöfn
- 2019–2022: Tindastóll
- 2022–2024: Ratiopharm Ulm (assistant)
- 2024–2026: Stjarnan
- 2026–present: Álftanes

Career highlights
- As player: Icelandic Super Cup (2016); Icelandic D1 winner (2011); Icelandic D1 assist leader (2011); Icelandic D1 Domestic All-First team (2010); As head coach: Icelandic champion (2025); Úrvalsdeild karla Coach of the Year (2022); As assistant coach: 2x Icelandic Super Cup (2016, 2017)

Baldur Þór Ragnarsson (born 23 February 1990) is an Icelandic basketball coach and a former player. He won the Icelandic championship in 2025 with Stjarnan.

== Playing career ==
Baldur spent his entire senior team career with Þór Þorlákshöfn, first appearing with the team during the 2006–2007 season when the club was relegated from the Úrvalsdeild karla on the last day of the regular season. His best season came in 2010–2011 when he led the 1. deild karla in assists, helping Þór to a victory in the league and promotion back to the Úrvalsdeild.

== Coaching career ==
In 2015, Baldur was hired as an assistant coach to Einar Árni Jóhannsson with Þór. Prior to the 2018–2019 season, he was promoted to head coach after Einar Árni announced that he would not continue with the team. During the regular season, he led Þór to the 6th seed in the playoffs and was named the best coach of the second half of the season. In the first round, Þór mounted an improbable comeback after losing the first two games in the best-of-three series against Tindastóll, by winning the next three. In the fifth an deciding game, Þór was down by 23 points before rallying back and scoring the game winning basket with 2 seconds to go. In the semi-finals, Þór lost to eventual champions KR.

In May 2019, Baldur was hired as the head coach of Tindastóll, replacing Israel Martín. The hiring did not come without a controversy as Þór claimed that Baldur was still under contract when Tindastóll offered him the job.

In 2022, he led Tindastóll to the Úrvalsdeild finals where the team lost to Valur 3–2.

In July 2022, Baldur was added to the coaching staff of Ratiopharm Ulm.

In April 2024, Baldur was hired as the head coach of Stjarnan. In May 2025, he won the national championship with Stjarnan. In May 2026, he resigned from Stjarnan.

The same month, he was hired as the head coach of Garðabær rivals Álftanes.
