= 2017–18 Icelandic Men's Basketball Cup =

Basketball competition in Iceland

2017–2018 Bikarkeppni Karla
Tournament details
- Arena: Laugardalshöll; Reykjavík
- Dates: 10–13 January 2018

Final positions
- Champions: Tindastóll
- Runners-up: KR

Awards and statistics
- MVP: (Iceland) Pétur Rúnar Birgisson

The 2017–2018 Bikarkeppni karla was the 52nd edition of the Icelandic Men's Basketball Cup, won by Tindastóll against former 2-time reigning cup holders KR. The competition is managed by the Icelandic Basketball Federation and the final four was held in Reykjavík, in the Laugardalshöll in January 2018. Pétur Rúnar Birgisson was named the Cup Finals MVP after turning in 22 points, 8 assists and 7 rebounds.

== Participating teams ==
Thirty-six teams signed up for the Cup tournament.

== Bracket ==
Quarterfinals
11 December
Njarðvík	68
KR	87
11 December
Breiðablik	96
Höttur	85
10 December
Keflavík	74
Haukar	83
11 December
Tindastóll	78
ÍR	74

Semifinals
10 January
KR	90
Breiðablik	71
10 January
Haukar	75
Tindastóll	85

Final
13 January
KR	69
Tindastóll	96

== Cup Finals MVP ==
Pos.	Player	Team
PG	(Iceland) Pétur Rúnar Birgisson	Tindastóll
