= Tindastóll (men's basketball) =

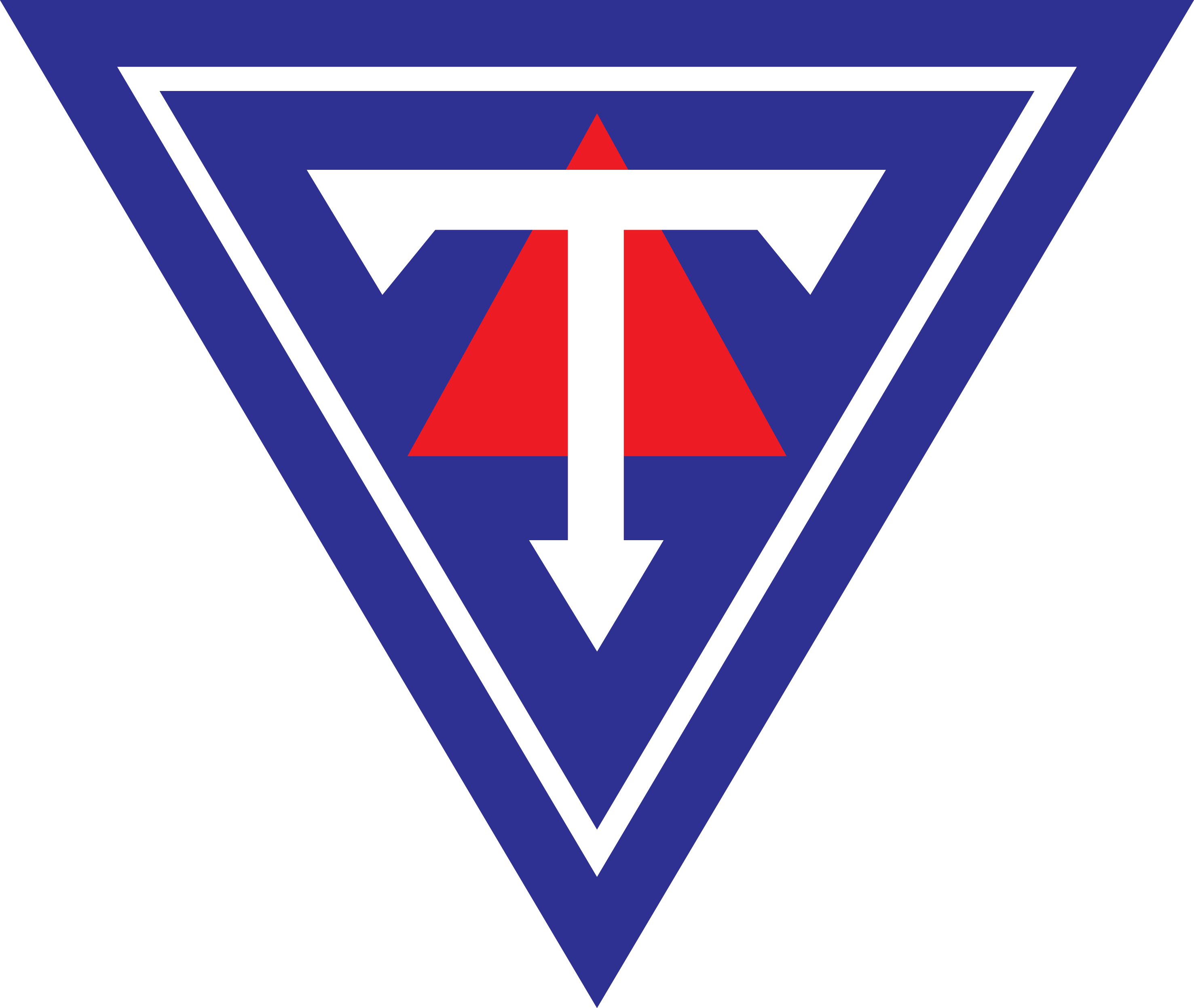
- Leagues: Úrvalsdeild karla
- Founded: 1964
- Arena: Síkið
- Location: Sauðárkrókur, Iceland
- President: Dagur Þór Baldvinsson
- Head coach: Arnar Guðjónsson
- Championships: 1 Icelandic championship 1 Icelandic Cup
- Website: tindastoll.is
Home	Away

The Tindastóll men's basketball team, commonly known as Tindastóll, is the men's basketball department of the Ungmennafélagið Tindastóll sport club, a club founded in 1907, with the basketball division established in 1964. It is based in Sauðárkrókur, Iceland.

In 2015 and 2018, it was the runner up to the Icelandic national championship. On 13 January 2018, the club won its first major title when it beat KR in the Icelandic Basketball Cup finals. On 30 September 2018, Tindastóll defeated KR in the Icelandic Super Cup, 103–72.
On 18 May 2023, Tindastóll won its first national championship after defeating Valur 3–2 in a finals rematch from 2022.

== Trophies and awards ==
=== titles ===
- Icelandic championship:
  - 2023
- Icelandic Basketball Cup:
  - 2018
- Icelandic Super Cup:
  - 2018
- Icelandic Company Cup (2):
  - 1999, 2012
- Division I (3):
  - 1988, 2006, 2014
- Division II:
  - 1986

== Season by season ==
Season	Tier	Division	Pos.	Icelandic Cup	European competitions		
2022–23	1	Úrvalsdeild karla	Champions				
2023–24	1	Úrvalsdeild karla	7th	Runner-up	4 FIBA Europe Cup	QR	1-1
2024–25	1	Úrvalsdeild karla	Runner-up	Eighth-finalist			
2025–26	1	Úrvalsdeild karla	Runner-up	Semi-finalist	R European North Basketball League	R16	6-3
2026–27	1	Úrvalsdeild karla	TBD	TBD	R European North Basketball League	RS	0-0

== Notable players ==
Note: Flags indicate national team eligibility at FIBA-sanctioned events. Players may hold other non-FIBA nationalities not displayed.

Criteria

To appear in this section a player must have either:

- Set a club record or won an individual award while at the club
- Played at least one official international match for their national team at any time
- Played at least one official NBA match at any time.

- (United States) Antonio Hester
- (Iceland) Axel Kárason
- (Iceland) Brynjar Þór Björnsson
- (England) Chris Caird
- (Iceland) Danero Thomas
- (Finland) Daniel Dolenc
- (Iceland) Darrel Lewis
- (England) David Aliu
- (Greece) Dimitrios Agravanis
- (Iceland) Eyjólfur Sverrisson
- (Iceland) Helgi Rafn Viggósson
- (Iceland) Hinrik Gunnarsson
- (Croatia) Jasmin Perković
- (Iceland) Kári Marísson
- (United States) Keyshawn Woods
- (Iceland) Kristinn Friðriksson
- (Spain) Mamadou Samb
- (Nigeria) Michael Ojo
- (Iceland) Páll Kolbeinsson
- (Iceland) Pétur Guðmundsson
- (Iceland) Pétur Rúnar Birgisson
- (Mali) Sadio Doucouré
- (Albania) (Kosovo) Samir Shaptahu
- (Netherlands) Sean Cunningham
- (Iceland) Sigtryggur Arnar Björnsson
- (Iceland) Sverrir Þór Sverrisson
- (Republic of Ireland) Taiwo Badmus
- (Sweden) Thomas Massamba
- (Iceland) Valur Ingimundarson

== Coaches ==
- (Iceland) Kári Marísson ?–1988
- (Iceland) Valur Ingimundarson 1988–1989
- (Iceland) Kári Marísson 1989
- (Iceland) Valur Ingimundarson 1989–1990
- (Czech Republic) Milan Rozanek 1990–1991
- (Iceland) Valur Ingimundarson 1991–1993
- (Croatia) Petar Jelic 1993–1994
- (Iceland) Páll Kolbeinsson 1994–1996
- (Hungary) Agoston Nagy 1996–1997
- (Iceland) Páll Kolbeinsson 1997–1998
- (Iceland) Valur Ingimundarson 1998–2002
- (Iceland) Kristinn Friðriksson 2002–2004
- (Iceland) Kári Marísson 2004–2005
- (Iceland) Kristinn Friðriksson 2005–2009
- (Iceland) Karl Jónsson 2009–2010
- (North Macedonia) Borce Ilievski 2010–2011
- (Iceland) Bárður Eyþórsson 2011–2014
- (Spain) Israel Martín 2014–2015
- (Finland) Pieti Poikola 2015
- (Iceland) Kári Marísson 2015 (interim)
- (Spain) José María Costa Gómez 2015–2016
- (Spain) Israel Martín 2016–2019
- (Iceland) Baldur Þór Ragnarsson 2019–2022
- (Croatia) Vladimir Anzulović 2022–2023
- (Iceland) Pavel Ermolinskij 2023–2024
- (Iceland) Svavar Atli Birgisson and Helgi Freyr Margeirsson 2024 (interim)
- (Iceland) Benedikt Guðmundsson 2024–2025
- (Iceland) Arnar Guðjónsson 2025–present
