= List of first overall NBA G League draft picks =

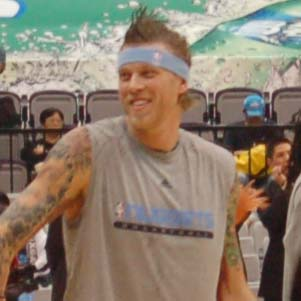
Chris Andersen was the first ever NBADL Draft selection as the number one pick in 2001.

The NBA G League's first overall pick is the player who is selected first among all eligible draftees by a team during the annual NBA G League Draft (known as the NBA Development League Draft until 2017). For players to become eligible for the draft they must sign a general contract with the league. They must also be at least 18 years old, not attending college during the season which the draft precedes, and have either graduated from high school or, if the player did not finish high school, had what would have been his graduating class graduate.

No first overall picks have ever won the G League Most Valuable Player Award. Five players have been named to at least one NBA Development League All-Star Game: Andre Barrett, Eddie Gill, Chris Richard, Carlos Powell (twice) and Nick Fazekas. The first All-Star Game did not occur until the 2006–07 season, however, and so the possibility for players such as Mikki Moore to earn an All-Star selection was not possible. Moore was named the NBDL Defensive Player of the Year and was named to the All-NBDL First Team as a rookie in 2002–03. Fazekas, the first overall selection in 2010, and Powell, the first overall selection in 2009, each had previous NBA Development League experience prior to those respective drafts. In 2007–08, Fazekas had played for the Tulsa 66ers while Powell had played for the Dakota Wizards, and both were selected as NBA Development League All-Stars that season, making them back-to-back number one draft picks who had previously been NBADL All-Stars.

Note that from the 2001 through 2004 drafts, it was known as the NBDL Draft. From 2005 through 2016, it was known as the NBA Development League Draft in accordance with the league's slight name change. The 2017 draft was the first under the league's current identity as the NBA G League, following a sponsorship deal with Gatorade.

== Key ==
^	Denotes player who has been selected to (an) NBA G League All-Star Game(s)
*	Denotes player who has been selected to (an) NBA G League All-Star Game(s) and was also selected in an NBA draft
†	Denotes player who was also selected in an NBA Draft
Player (in italic text)	Rookie of the Year
PPG	Points per game^{[a]}
RPG	Rebounds per game^{[a]}
APG	Assists per game^{[a]}

== List of first overall picks ==
Draft	Selected by	Player	Nationality	College/former club^{[b]}	PPG^{[a]}	RPG^{[a]}	APG^{[a]}	Ref.
2001	Fayetteville Patriots	Chris Andersen	United States	Blinn CC	4.7	3.7	0.3	
2002	Roanoke Dazzle	Mikki Moore	United States	Detroit Pistons	16.0	8.4	2.5	
2003	Huntsville Flight	Ken Johnson^{†}	United States	Miami Heat	8.5	4.9	0.9	
2004	Columbus Riverdragons	Ricky Minard^{†}	United States	Morehead State	16.6	4.3	3.1	
2005	Florida Flame	Andre Barrett^	United States	Orlando Magic	17.0	3.5	6.6	
2006	Anaheim Arsenal	Corsley Edwards^{†}	United States	CB Granada (Spain)	14.2	7.5	0.4	
2007	Colorado 14ers	Eddie Gill^	United States	BC Dynamo Moscow (Russia)	18.0	5.1	8.5	
2008	Tulsa 66ers	Chris Richard*	United States	Minnesota Timberwolves / Sioux Falls Skyforce	12.0	8.2	1.7	
2009	Albuquerque Thunderbirds	Carlos Powell^	United States	Inchon ET Land Black Slamer (South Korea)	22.1	5.0	5.0	
2010	Reno Bighorns	Nick Fazekas*	United States	JDA Dijon (France)	14.6	7.5	0.8	
2011	Los Angeles D-Fenders	Jamaal Tinsley^{†}	United States	Memphis Grizzlies	9.9	3.1	7.6	
2012	Fort Wayne Mad Ants	JaJuan Johnson^{†}	United States	Boston Celtics	11.6	11.2	0.8	
2013	Tulsa 66ers	Grant Jerrett^{†}	United States	Arizona	15.1	6.1	0.7	
2014	Grand Rapids Drive	Robert Covington	United States	Rio Grande Valley Vipers	—^{[c]}	—^{[c]}	—^{[c]}	
2015	Idaho Stampede	Jeff Ayres^{†}	United States	San Antonio Spurs	16.2	9.5	2.2	
2016	Erie Bayhawks	Anthony Brown^{†}	United States	Los Angeles D-Fenders	20.3	5.4	3.1	
2017	Northern Arizona Suns	Eric Stuteville	United States	Sacramento State	5.1	2.4	0.5	
2018	Salt Lake City Stars	Willie Reed^	United States	Detroit Pistons	20.0	11.2	1.5	
2019	Northern Arizona Suns	Anthony Lawrence II	United States	Miami (Florida)	8.9	3.9	2.2	
2020	Due to the COVID-19 pandemic, the 2020–21 season draft was held on January 11, 2021							
Jan. 2021	Greensboro Swarm	Admiral Schofield^{†}	United States	Washington Wizards / Capital City Go-Go	10.1	5.7	2.1	
Oct. 2021	Delaware Blue Coats	Shamorie Ponds	United States	OKK Spars (Bosnia and Herzegovina)	13.5	5.5	5.5	
2022	Cleveland Charge	Sam Merrill^{†}	United States	Memphis Grizzlies	15.2	3.9	2.8	
2023	Texas Legends	Jack White	Australia	Denver Nuggets	9.1	6.1	1.8	
2024	Westchester Knicks	Matt Ryan	United States	New Orleans Pelicans	15.5	4.5	1.5	
2025	South Bay Lakers	Dillon Jones^{†}	United States	Oklahoma City Thunder	15.7	6.6	6.3	
2026	Texas Legends	Jeremy Sochan^{†}	United States	New York Knicks	TBD	TBD	TBD	

== See also ==
- List of first overall NBA draft picks
- List of first overall WNBA draft picks

== Notes ==
- ^{a} All statistics are taken from the players' respective draft seasons.
- ^{b} Indicates the college team, semi-professional and/or professional basketball team that the player most recently competed for heading into his respective draft.
- ^{c} Robert Covington signed with the Philadelphia 76ers prior to playing in a D-League game in 2014–15. He spent the entire season with the 76ers and did not accumulate any D-League statistics.
