= 2002 National Basketball Development League draft =

General information
- Sport: Basketball
- Date: October 31, 2002

Overview
- Teams: 8
- First selection: Mikki Moore, Roanoke Dazzle

The 2002 NBDL Draft was held on October 31, 2002. One hundred twelve picks were made over fourteen rounds.

== Draft ==
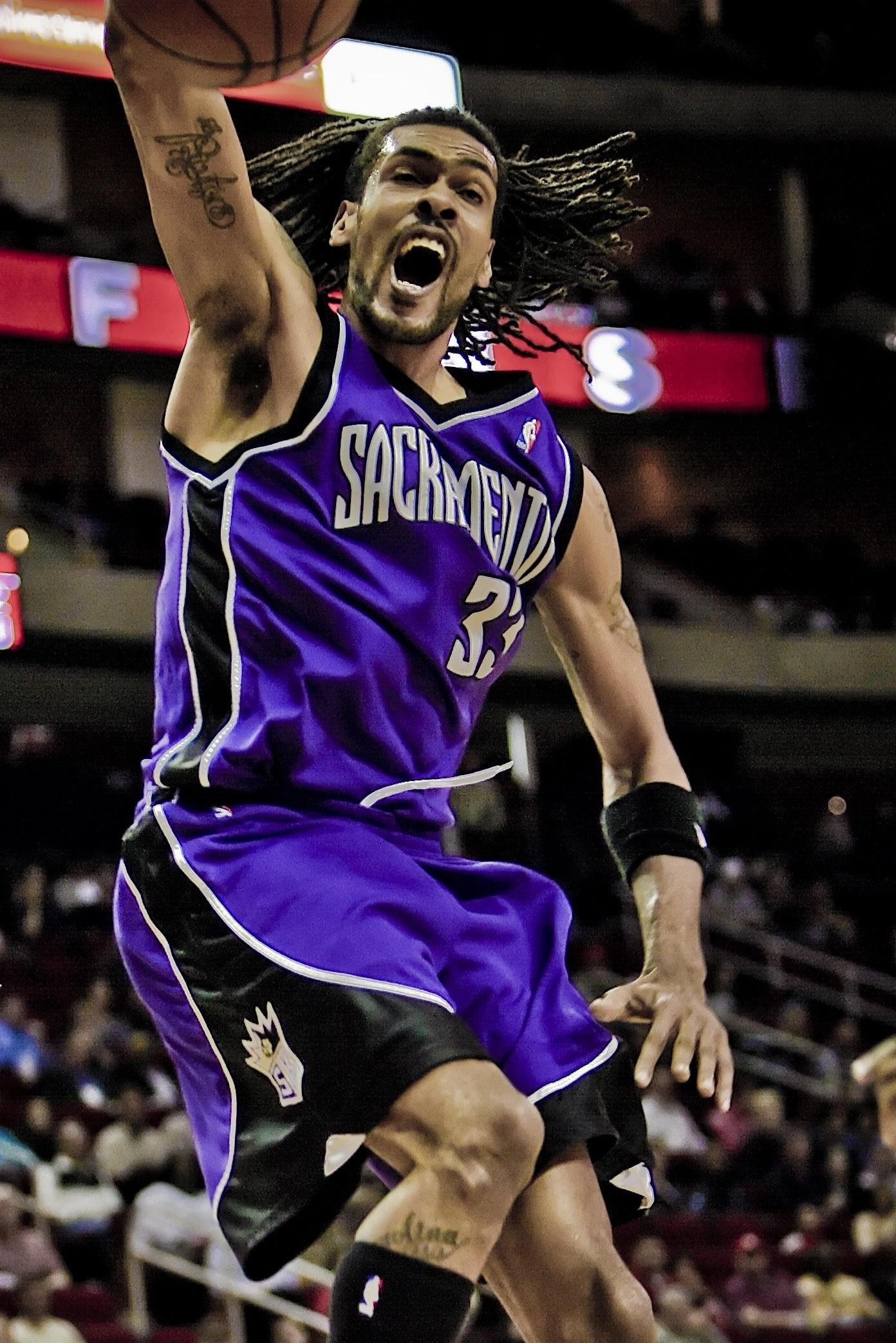
Mikki Moore with the Sacramento Kings in 2008

Round 1
#	Team	Draftee
1	Roanoke Dazzle	Mikki Moore
2	Fayetteville Patriots	Devin Brown
3	Asheville Altitude	Andre Woolridge
4	Huntsville Flight	Bakari Hendrix
5	Mobile Revelers	Bobby Simmons
6	Columbus Riverdragons	Derek Strong
7	North Charleston Lowgators	Corey Benjamin
8	Greenville Groove	Kevin Lyde

Round 2
#	Team	Draftee
9	Roanoke Dazzle	Jamal Robinson
10	Fayetteville Patriots	Raymond Dalmau
11	Asheville Altitude	Eddie Elisma
12	Huntsville Flight	Jefferson de Souza Sobral
13	Mobile Revelers	Ernest Brown
14	Columbus Riverdragons	Lonnie Jones
15	North Charleston Lowgators	Larry Reid
16	Greenville Groove	Brandon Kurtz

Round 3
#	Team	Draftee
17	Roanoke Dazzle	George Williams
18	Fayetteville Patriots	Bryan Lucas
19	Asheville Altitude	Ron Rollerson
20	Huntsville Flight	Brandon Williams
21	Mobile Revelers	Christian Dalmau
22	Columbus Riverdragons	Willie Davis
23	North Charleston Lowgators	T. J. McKenzie
24	Greenville Groove	Shawn Igo

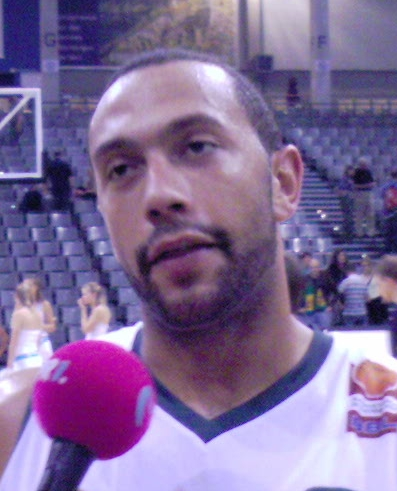
Tommy Adams with TBB Trier in 2006

Round 4
#	Team	Draftee
25	Roanoke Dazzle	Geoff Owens
26	Fayetteville Patriots	Earl Ike
27	Asheville Altitude	Kevin Daley
28	Huntsville Flight	Marcus Fleming
29	Mobile Revelers	Joe White
30	Columbus Riverdragons	Greg Clausen
31	North Charleston Lowgators	Ime Udoka
32	Greenville Groove	Tommy Adams

Round 5
#	Team	Draftee
33	Roanoke Dazzle	Derrick Ziegler
34	Fayetteville Patriots	Marlon Dumont
35	Asheville Altitude	Ryan Carroll
36	Huntsville Flight	Kevin Shand
37	Mobile Revelers	Jason Williams
38	Columbus Riverdragons	Marcus Evans
39	North Charleston Lowgators	David Dixon
40	Greenville Groove	Anthony Lackey

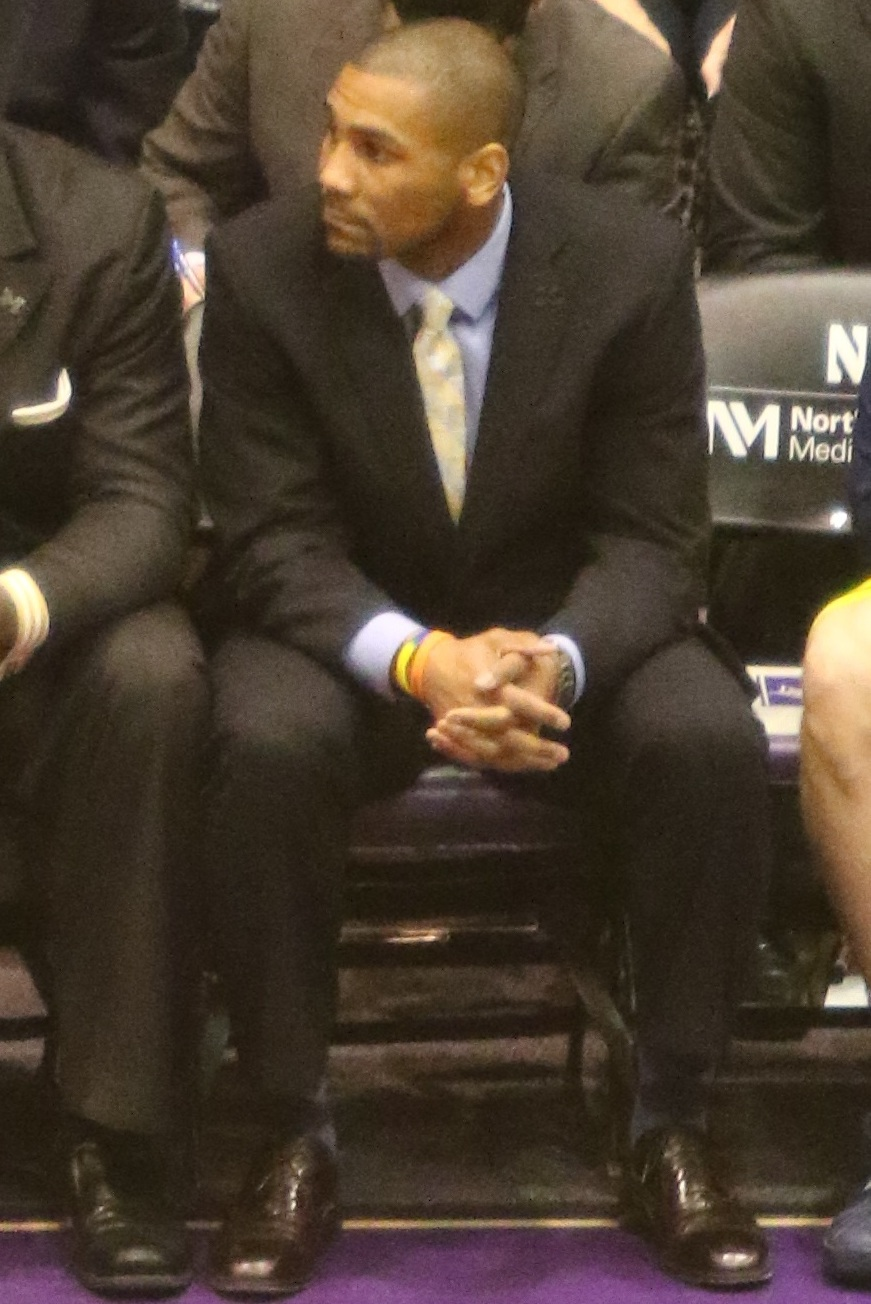
LaVall Jordan coaching for Michigan in 2015

Round 6
#	Team	Draftee
41	Roanoke Dazzle	Duke Freeman-McKamey
42	Fayetteville Patriots	Marc Mazur
43	Asheville Altitude	Wayland White
44	Huntsville Flight	LaVall Jordan
45	Mobile Revelers	Markus Carr
46	Columbus Riverdragons	Adam Hall
47	North Charleston Lowgators	J. R. VanHoose
48	Greenville Groove	Eric Williams

Round 7
#	Team	Draftee
49	Roanoke Dazzle	Troy Wiley
50	Fayetteville Patriots	Kenny Dye
51	Asheville Altitude	Daryan Selvey
52	Huntsville Flight	Rashid Hardwick
53	Mobile Revelers	Geno Carlisle
54	Columbus Riverdragons	Kwame James
55	North Charleston Lowgators	Damone Brown
56	Greenville Groove	Tory Walker

Round 8
#	Team	Draftee
57	Roanoke Dazzle	Cypheus Bunton
58	Fayetteville Patriots	Kyrem Massey
59	Asheville Altitude	Jeff Trapagnier
60	Huntsville Flight	Omar Weaver
61	Mobile Revelers	Johnny Phillips
62	Columbus Riverdragons	Jermaine Walker
63	North Charleston Lowgators	Tobe Carberry
64	Greenville Groove	John Lineham

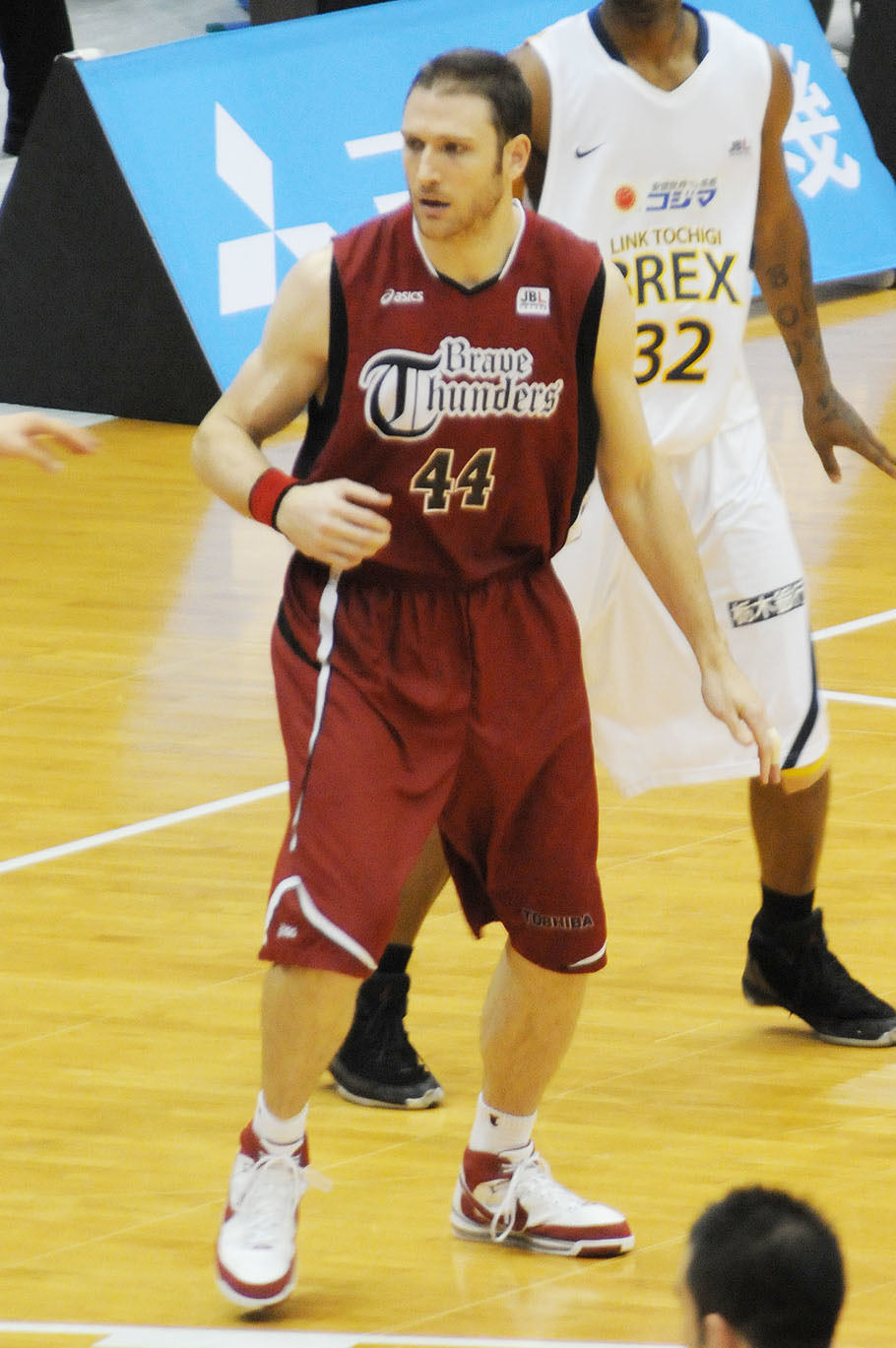
Peter Cornell with Kawasaki Brave Thunders in 2008

Round 9
#	Team	Draftee
65	Roanoke Dazzle	Jelani Gardner
66	Fayetteville Patriots	Alpha Bangura
67	Asheville Altitude	Brandon Smith
68	Huntsville Flight	Gyasi Cline-Heard
69	Mobile Revelers	Peter Cornell
70	Columbus Riverdragons	Reggie Butler
71	North Charleston Lowgators	Travis Robinson
72	Greenville Groove	Kashien Latham

Round 10
#	Team	Draftee
73	Roanoke Dazzle	Terrance Shannon
74	Fayetteville Patriots	Bobby Smith
75	Asheville Altitude	Larry Abney
76	Huntsville Flight	Terrance Simmons
77	Mobile Revelers	Shea Seals
78	Columbus Riverdragons	David Capers
79	North Charleston Lowgators	Tierre Brown
80	Greenville Groove	Greg Jones

Round 11
#	Team	Draftee
81	Roanoke Dazzle	Mike King
82	Fayetteville Patriots	Bayonne Taty
83	Asheville Altitude	Damian Reid
84	Huntsville Flight	Damon Reed
85	Mobile Revelers	Tai Crutchfield
86	Columbus Riverdragons	Lenny Cooke
87	North Charleston Lowgators	Nate James
88	Greenville Groove	Ned Rolsma

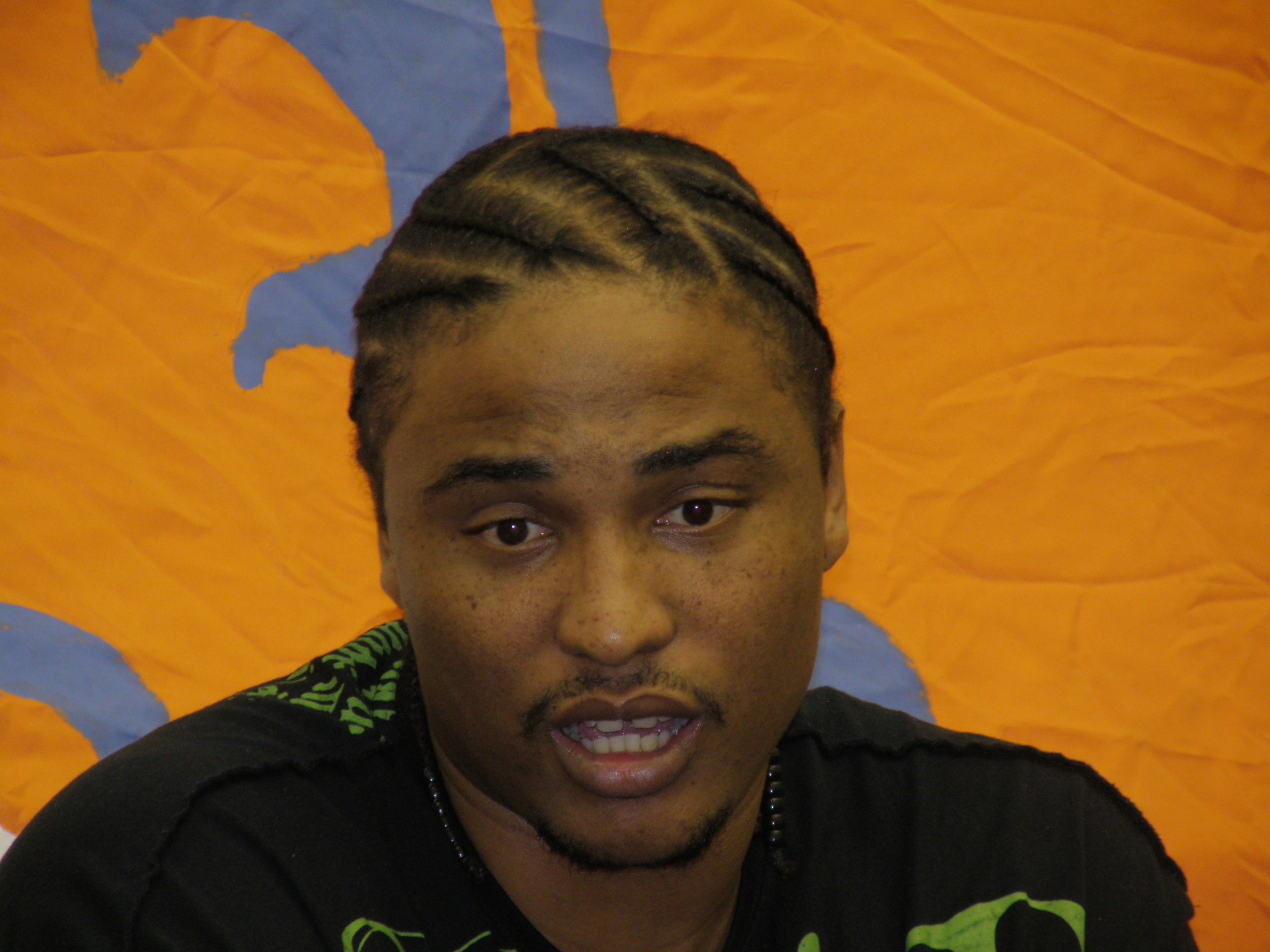
Omar Sneed in Israel in 2009 while playing for Hapoel Jerusalem B.C.

Round 12
#	Team	Draftee
89	Roanoke Dazzle	Daymeon Fishback
90	Fayetteville Patriots	Kris Hunter
91	Asheville Altitude	Lou Kelly
92	Huntsville Flight	Omar Sneed
93	Mobile Revelers	Johnny Hemsley
94	Columbus Riverdragons	Dave Korfman
95	North Charleston Lowgators	Sam Haley
96	Greenville Groove	Donald Hand

Round 13
#	Team	Draftee
97	Roanoke Dazzle	Troy Rolle
98	Fayetteville Patriots	Fred Williams
99	Asheville Altitude	Steven Barber
100	Huntsville Flight	Sean Kennedy
101	Mobile Revelers	Jean-Paul Afif
102	Columbus Riverdragons	Aaron Owens
103	North Charleston Lowgators	Antwain Smith
104	Greenville Groove	Ben Adams

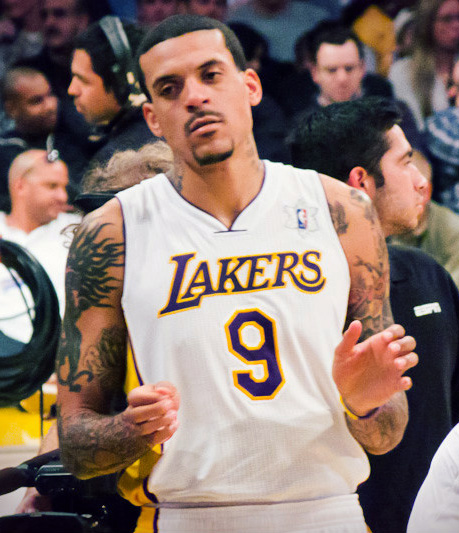
Matt Barnes with the Los Angeles Lakers in 2010

Round 14
#	Team	Draftee
105	Roanoke Dazzle	Demetrius Porter
106	Fayetteville Patriots	Matt Barnes
107	Asheville Altitude	Kenny Brunner
108	Huntsville Flight	Eric Harris
109	Mobile Revelers	Teddy Dupay
110	Columbus Riverdragons	Marcus Taylor
111	North Charleston Lowgators	Yuichiro Morishita
112	Greenville Groove	Lawrence Moten
