= 2001 National Basketball Development League draft =

General information
- Sport: Basketball
- Date: November 1, 2001
- Location: Suwanee, Georgia

Overview
- League: NBA
- First selection: Chris Andersen, Fayetteville Patriots

The 2001 NBDL Draft was the inaugural draft of the National Basketball Development League (NBDL), which was later renamed the NBA Development League (NBADL). The draft was held on November 1, 2001 before the 2001–02 season. In this draft, the league's eight charter teams took turns selecting players who had all competed at the college level in the United States at some point.

Chris Andersen of Blinn Community College (Brenham, Texas) was the first overall selection and was taken by Fayetteville Patriots. Consequently, this makes him the first-ever selection in the history of the NBADL. The first non-American selected was Gabe Muoneke, a Nigerian who was the fourth overall pick by the Columbus Riverdragons. Eight nations in all were represented in the 2001 NBDL Draft, with the most being the United States (87) followed by Senegal (3). No players selected in this draft have ever been named an NBA D-League All-Star, largely because the annual contest did not come into existence until the 2006–07 season. Two league award winners were taken in this draft, however: Fred House of the North Charleston Lowgators (46th overall) was named the 2001–02 NBDL Rookie of the Year, while Jeff Myers of the Greenville Groove (67th overall) was tabbed the Defensive Player of the Year. Four players were also NBA draft selections: DeeAndre Hulett, Mark Karcher and Jaquay Walls were all picked in the 2000 NBA draft, while Kris Bruton was picked in 1994.

Although some of the players chosen in the 2001 NBDL Draft had played semi-professional and/or professional basketball after college graduation, only the United States colleges they attended are listed.

== Key ==
Pos.	G	F	C
Position	Guard	Forward	Center

^	Denotes player who has been selected to (an) NBA Development League All-Star Game(s)
*	Denotes player who has been selected to (an) NBA Development League All-Star Game(s) and was also selected in an NBA draft
†	Denotes player who was also selected in an NBA Draft

== Draft ==
Round	Pick	Player	Position	Nationality	Team	College	Year graduated
1	1	Chris Andersen	F/C	United States	Fayetteville Patriots	Blinn CC (Brenham, TX)	1999
1	2	Terrance Roberson	G/F	United States	Huntsville Flight	Fresno State	2000
1	3	Rahim Lockhart	F	United States	Greenville Groove	Mississippi	2001
1	4	Gabe Muoneke	F	Nigeria	Columbus Riverdragons	Texas	2000
1	5	Johnny Hemsley	G	United States	Asheville Altitude	Miami (FL)	2000
1	6	Neil Edwards	C	United States	North Charleston Lowgators	York	2000
1	7	Rashad Phillips	G	United States	Mobile Revelers	Detroit Mercy	2001
1	8	Artie Griffin	G	United States	Roanoke Dazzle	Alabama	1995
2	9	Darrell Johns	C	United States	Fayetteville Patriots	Chicago State	2001
2	10	Lonnie Harrell	G/F	United States	Huntsville Flight	Northeastern	1996
2	11	Ed Daniels	G	United States	Greenville Groove	TCU	2001
2	12	Kareem Poole	C	United States	Columbus Riverdragons	Tyler CC (Tyler, TX)	1999
2	13	Jermaine Tate	F/C	United States	Asheville Altitude	Cincinnati	2000
2	14	C. J. Black	F/C	United States	North Charleston Lowgators	Tennessee	2000
2	15	Nick Sheppard	C	United States	Mobile Revelers	Pepperdine	2000
2	16	Marshall Phillips	G/F	United States	Roanoke Dazzle	Appalachian State	2000
3	17	Brian Wardle	G	United States	Fayetteville Patriots	Marquette	2001
3	18	John Jackson	F	United States	Huntsville Flight	Mississippi	1998
3	19	DeeAndre Hulett^{†}	G/F	United States	Greenville Groove	College of the Sequoias	2000
3	20	Stephen Starks	G	United States	Columbus Riverdragons	Drexel	2001
3	21	Sah-U-Ra Brown	C	United States	Asheville Altitude	Lehigh	2001
3	22	Joe Brown	G/F	United States	North Charleston Lowgators	Coppin State	2000
3	23	Chris Crosby	F	United States	Mobile Revelers	Washington State	2001
3	24	Carl Thomas	G/F	United States	Roanoke Dazzle	College of Charleston	1999
4	25	Rasul Salahuddin	G	United States	Fayetteville Patriots	Long Beach State	1996
4	26	Jeremy Veal	G	United States	Huntsville Flight	Arizona State	1998
4	27	Pate Diene	C	Senegal	Greenville Groove	Texas A&M–Corpus Christi	2001
4	28	Harold Arceneaux	F	United States	Columbus Riverdragons	Weber State	2000
4	29	Troy Rolle	G	United States	Asheville Altitude	Utah State	2000
4	30	Chris Bacon	F	United States	North Charleston Lowgators	Nicholls State	2001
4	31	Eugene Edgerson	F	United States	Mobile Revelers	Arizona	2001
4	32	Keil Zepernick	F/C	United States	Roanoke Dazzle	Barton County CC (Great Bend, KS)	1999
5	33	Jeff Aubrey	C	United States	Fayetteville Patriots	Cornell	1999
5	34	Mohamed Niang	C	Senegal	Huntsville Flight	Delaware	1999
5	35	Tony Christie	F	United States	Greenville Groove	Clemson	1999
5	36	Allen Griffin	G	United States	Columbus Riverdragons	Syracuse	2001
5	37	Anthony Blakes	G	United States	Asheville Altitude	Wyoming	2000
5	38	Tezale Archie	G	United States	North Charleston Lowgators	Pepperdine	2000
5	39	Steve Hart	G	United States	Mobile Revelers	Indiana State	1998
5	40	Cheikh Fall	C	Senegal	Roanoke Dazzle	Long Island	1999
6	41	Greg Stempin	G/F	United States	Fayetteville Patriots	Toledo	2001
6	42	Tyrone Ellis	G	United States; Georgia	Huntsville Flight	Southern Nazarene	2001
6	43	Eric Coley	G	United States	Greenville Groove	Tulsa	2000
6	44	Johnny Phillips	F	United States	Columbus Riverdragons	Texas Tech	2001
6	45	Sergio McClain	G	United States	Asheville Altitude	Illinois	2001
6	46	Fred House	G	United States	North Charleston Lowgators	Southern Utah	2001
6	47	Osiris Ricardo	C	Dominican Republic	Mobile Revelers	Missouri Southern State	2000
6	48	Lee Wilson	C	United States	Roanoke Dazzle	Arkansas	1997
7	49	Curtis Haywood	G/F	United States	Fayetteville Patriots	Oklahoma City	1999
7	50	Albert Richardson	F	United States	Huntsville Flight	Kentucky Wesleyan	1999
7	51	Tate Decker	F/C	United States	Greenville Groove	Oklahoma City	2001
7	52	Nate Johnson	F	United States	Columbus Riverdragons	Louisville	2000
7	53	Lorenzo Johnson	F	United States	Asheville Altitude	Colorado State	1998
7	54	Luther Clay	F	United States	North Charleston Lowgators	Rhode Island	2000
7	55	Brian Jones	G	United States	Mobile Revelers	Santa Clara	2001
7	56	Jaron Rush	F	United States	Roanoke Dazzle	UCLA	2000
8	57	Joe White	F	United States	Fayetteville Patriots	Texas A&M	1999
8	58	Jimmie Hunter	G	United States	Huntsville Flight	Life University	2000
8	59	Mark Karcher^{†}	G	United States	Greenville Groove	Temple	2000
8	60	Deaundra Tanner	G	United States	Columbus Riverdragons	Oregon State	2001
8	61	J. B. Reafsnyder	C	United States	Asheville Altitude	Syracuse	1996
8	62	Victor Avila	F/C	Mexico	North Charleston Lowgators	Oklahoma	2000
8	63	Alan Barksdale	G	United States	Mobile Revelers	Arkansas–Little Rock	2001
8	64	Cornelius Jackson	G	United States	Roanoke Dazzle	Marshall	2001
9	65	Mike King	G	United States	Fayetteville Patriots	George Washington	2001
9	66	Deng D'Awol	C	Tanzania	Huntsville Flight	Wayland Baptist	2001
9	67	Jeff Myers	G	United States	Greenville Groove	Drexel	1997
9	68	George Reese	F	United States	Columbus Riverdragons	Ohio State	2000
9	69	Corey Tarrant	G	United States	Asheville Altitude	Eastern Michigan	2000
9	70	Don Carlisle	F	United States	North Charleston Lowgators	IUPUI	2001
9	71	Maurice Linton	F	United States	Mobile Revelers	Wisconsin	2001
9	72	Ceedric Goodwyn	F	United States	Roanoke Dazzle	Colorado State	2000
10	73	Tim Kisner	G	United States	Fayetteville Patriots	Central Michigan	2001
10	74	Walter Craft	C	United States	Huntsville Flight	Detroit Mercy	2001
10	75	Kris Bruton^{†}	G/F	United States	Greenville Groove	Benedict College	1994
10	76	Daymeon Fishback	G/F	United States	Columbus Riverdragons	Auburn	1999
10	77	Jaquay Walls^{†}	G	United States	Asheville Altitude	Colorado	2000
10	78	Tess Whitlock	G	United States	North Charleston Lowgators	Hawaiʻi	1997
10	79	Kenny Gregory	G	United States	Mobile Revelers	Kansas	2001
10	80	Charles Hathaway	C	United States	Roanoke Dazzle	Tennessee	2001
11	81	Rodney Morning	C	United States	Fayetteville Patriots	Fayetteville State	2001
11	82	Cedric McGinnis	F	United States	Huntsville Flight	Georgia Southern	1999
11	83	Rob Griffin	G/F	United States	Greenville Groove	Iowa	2001
11	84	Rineo Vlijter	C	Suriname	Columbus Riverdragons	Saint Ambrose	2001
11	85	Jeff Boese	F	United States	Asheville Altitude	Mesa State	2001
11	86	Michael Canady	C	United States	North Charleston Lowgators	Morgan State	2001
11	87	Jason Skaer	G/F	United States	Mobile Revelers	Rice	1999
11	88	Clayton Shields	SF	United States	Roanoke Dazzle	New Mexico	2001
12	89	Edward Johnson	F	United States	Fayetteville Patriots	Utah	1993
12	90	Geoff Brower	G	United States	Huntsville Flight	Lander University	2000
12	91	Shenard Long	G	United States	Greenville Groove	Georgia State	2001
12	92	Fred Warrick	G	United States	Columbus Riverdragons	Coppin State	1999
12	93	Kevin Melson	G/F	United States	Asheville Altitude	Wright State	2001
12	94	Anthony Jones	G	United States	North Charleston Lowgators	Ohio	1999
12	95	Mike Wilks	G	United States	Mobile Revelers	Rice	2001
12	96	Terry Sellers	C	United States	Roanoke Dazzle	Iona	2001

a: Tyrone Ellis has become a naturalized citizen of Georgia since the 2001 NBDL Draft.

All information summarised in this table comes from the NBA draft announcement except the nationalities.
