= 2010–11 Úrvalsdeild karla (basketball) =

Iceland Express deild karla^{1}
- Duration: 7 October 2010 – 19 April 2011
- Teams: 12
- TV partner(s): Stöð 2 Sport

Regular season
- Top seed: Snæfell
- Relegated: Hamar, KFÍ

Finals
- Champions: KR (12th title)
- Runners-up: Stjarnan
- Semifinalists: Keflavík, Snæfell
- Finals MVP: (United States) Marcus Walker

Awards
- Domestic MVP: (Iceland) Pavel Ermolinskij
- Foreign MVP: (United States) Marcus Walker

Statistical leaders
Points	(United States) Marcus Walker	23.2
Rebounds	(United States) Gerald Robinson	13.6
Assists	(Iceland) Ægir Steinarsson	8.9
- ^{1} Sponsored league name, referring to Úrvalsdeild karla.

The 2010–11 Úrvalsdeild karla was the 66th season of the Úrvalsdeild karla, the top tier men's basketball league in Iceland. The season started on 7 October 2010 and ended on 19 April 2011. KR won its third title in four years, and 12th overall, by defeating Stjarnan 3–1 in the Finals. KFÍ and Hamar where relegated to 1. deild karla.

== Competition format ==
The participating teams first played a conventional round-robin schedule with every team playing each opponent once "home" and once "away" for a total of 22 games. The top eight teams qualified for the championship playoffs whilst the two last qualified were relegated to 1. deild karla.

== Regular season ==
Pos	Team	Pld	W	L	PF	PA	PD	Pts	Qualification or relegation
1	Snæfell	22	17	5	2105	1966	+139	34	Qualification to playoffs
2	KR	22	16	6	2158	1926	+232	32	Qualification to playoffs
3	Keflavík	22	16	6	2095	1910	+185	32	Qualification to playoffs
4	Grindavík	22	15	7	1849	1765	+84	30	Qualification to playoffs
5	Stjarnan	22	12	10	1878	1870	+8	24	Qualification to playoffs
6	ÍR	22	10	12	2021	2014	+7	20	Qualification to playoffs
7	Njarðvík	22	10	12	1820	1872	−52	20	Qualification to playoffs
8	Haukar	22	9	13	1842	1959	−117	18	Qualification to playoffs
9	Fjölnir	22	8	14	1944	2027	−83	16	
10	Tindastóll	22	7	15	1777	1876	−99	14	
11	Hamar	22	7	15	1748	1850	−102	14	Relegated
12	KFÍ	22	5	17	1885	2087	−202	10	Relegated

Source: KKÍ

== Playoffs ==
Quarterfinals
1	Snæfell	2
8	Haukar	1
4	Grindavík	1
5	Stjarnan	2
(Pairings are reseeded after the first round)
2	KR	2
7	Njarðvík	0
3	Keflavík	2
6	ÍR	1

Semifinals
1	Snæfell	0
5	Stjarnan	3
2	KR	3
3	Keflavík	2

Finals
2	KR	3
5	Stjarnan	1
