= Daymeon Fishback =

American basketball player

- Born: February 28, 1978 (age 48); Bowling Green, Kentucky, U.S.
- Education: Auburn University
- Occupations: Basketball player; financial advisor; sports broadcaster
- Employers: Merrill Lynch; Morgan Stanley; Fox Sports South; ESPN
- Height: 6 ft 5 in (196 cm)
- Basketball career

Career information
- High school: Greenwood High School (Bowling Green, Kentucky)
- College: Auburn (1996–2000)
- NBA draft: 2000: undrafted
- Playing career: 2000–2002
- Position: Shooting guard / small forward
- Number: 5, 23

Career history
- 2000–2001: Crvena zvezda

Career highlights
- SEC All-Academic Team (2000); Kentucky Mr. Basketball (1996)

Daymeon Fishback (born February 28, 1978) is an American financial advisor and former professional basketball player.

== High school career ==
Fishback was born in Bowling Green, Kentucky and played at Greenwood High School in Bowling Green. He played at Greenwood for the late Larry Cheatham and Hall of Fame Coach Curtis Turley. Fishback recorded 2,214 points, 916 rebounds, 470 assists, 168 blocked shots and 163 steals at Greenwood. In 1996, he was named the Kentucky Mr. Basketball.

== College career ==
Fishback played college basketball for the Auburn Tigers between 1996 and 2000. In 1999, Fishback helped Auburn win the SEC regular season title. Over 127 games in four seasons, he averaged 7.2 points, 3 rebounds, and an assist per game.

== Professional career ==
In 2000, Fishback signed with a YUBA League team Crvena zvezda for the 2000–01 season. Fishback was selected with the 76th overall pick in the 2001 NBDL draft by the Columbus Riverdragons, and with the 89th overall pick in the 2002 NBDL draft by the Roanoke Dazzle. Later, he played in France and Italy.

== Post-playing career ==
Fishback worked over a decade in Atlanta in the financial services industry, first at Merrill Lynch (2005–2013) and later at Morgan Stanley. Fishback has also worked as a color analyst for Fox Sports South and the Auburn Network.

In 2014, Fishback joined ESPN as an SEC Network game and studio analyst.
