= Gabe Muoneke =

American basketball player (born 1978)

Gabriel Muoneke
Personal information
- Born: February 7, 1978 (age 48) Ann Arbor, Michigan, U.S.
- Listed height: 6 ft 7 in (2.01 m)
- Listed weight: 250 lb (113 kg)

Career information
- High school: Cypress Falls (Houston, Texas)
- College: Texas
- NBA draft: 2000: undrafted
- Playing career: 2000–2009
- Position: Forward / center

Career history
- 2000: Fort Wayne Fury
- 2000: Chicago Skyliners
- 2000: Trenton Shooting Stars
- 2000–2001: Pınar Karşıyaka
- 2001: Boca Juniors
- 2001–2002: Columbus Riverdragons
- 2002: Santurce Crabbers
- 2002: Purefoods TJ Hotdogs
- 2002–2003: Roanoke Dazzle
- 2003: CB Cáceres
- 2003–2004: Beijing Aoshen
- 2004: Coamo Marathon Runners
- 2004–2005: Busan KTF Magic Wings
- 2005: Coamo Marathon Runners
- 2005–2006: Seoul SK Knights
- 2006: Ponce Lions
- 2006–2007: Zhejiang Guangsha
- 2007: Saba Battery
- 2007: Rio Grande Valley Vipers
- 2007–2008: TAU Cerámica
- 2008: Saba Battery
- 2008: ASVEL Villeurbanne
- 2008–2009: Yunnan Bulls

Career highlights
- FIBA Asia Champions Cup champion (2007); FIBA Asia Champions Cup MVP (2008); First-team All-Big 12 (1999); Second-team All-Big 12 (2000)

Nnadubem Gabriel Enyinaya Muoneke (born 7 February 1978, in Ann Arbor, Michigan) is a Nigerian American retired professional basketball player and businessman. Despite being born in the United States, Muoneke represented Nigeria internationally.

Muoneke attended Cypress Falls High School in northwest Houston, Texas. He then played for four years for the Texas Longhorns. Undrafted out of college in the NBA, he was a first round pick of the Columbus Riverdragons (now Austin Spurs) then the Roanoke Dazzle also of the NBDL. He has played in multiple NBA Summer Leagues including that of the Vancouver Grizzlies and the New Orleans Hornets. Muoneke also signed non-guaranteed NBA contracts with the Detroit Pistons, Houston Rockets, Charlotte Bobcats and the Utah Jazz but was waived from all four teams. He has played around the world, including with the Ponce Lions in Puerto Rico, Pınar Karşıyaka in Turkey, the Beijing Olympians in China, Busan KTF Magic Wings and Seoul SK Knights in South Korea, among other places.

== Early life ==
Muoneke was born in 1978 in Michigan to Igbo Nigerian parents Nik, a math professor, and Njudeka, a medical technologist. He first studied at St. Christopher’s Private Catholic School as he grew up in Houston, learning Latin, French, and German. He also learned how to play the piano and the saxophone at a young age.

When he was 13, Muoneke began pursuing basketball after his father (who at the time was completing his PhD at the University of Houston) introduced him to Hakeem Olajuwon.

== High school and college career ==
Muoneke attended Cypress Falls High School in northwest Houston, Texas. He graduated with a 5.9 GPA and became one of the most sought after high school seniors in the state of Texas and the US.

After graduation, he enrolled at the University of Texas at Austin on an athletic scholarship.

After his sophomore season, he and three other players considered transferring, as "they had lost faith in Penders and his program." Tom Penders resigned and Rick Barnes was hired.

In his junior year, Muoneke led the team in scoring averaging 16.7 points to go with his 6.3 rebounds. In a game against Wisconsin, he punched guard Hennessy Auriantal in the stomach. A month later, against Kansas, he punched Nick Bradford in the first half and T.J. Pugh twice in the second half. These incidents led to Barnes suspending him for one game. Their season ended in the first round of the Division I tournament, against 10th seeded Purdue, with Brian Cardinal stealing his inbounds pass in the final seconds to seal the win.

In his final year, Muoneke averaged 13.7 points and 6.3 rebounds. He graduated in 2002 with his degree in Petroleum Engineering. He finished his college career ranked in the top 15 in the history of University of Texas basketball in scoring (1,456 points), rebounding, and top 20 in games played and started.

== Professional career ==
=== Fort Wayne Fury ===
Muoneke applied for the 2000 NBA Draft, where he went undrafted. He was then drafted in the sixth round of the 2000 CBA draft by the Fort Wayne Fury.

=== Boca Juniors ===
Muoneke then spent some time overseas, averaging 19 points and 9.5 rebounds in Turkey (Pinar Karsiyaka). He then averaged and 19.8 points and 4.7 rebounds in Argentina with the Boca Juniors and contributed to their playoff run.

=== Columbus Riverdragons ===
Muoneke then returned to the US, where he became a first round pick (fourth overall) of the Columbus Riverdragons (now Austin Spurs) in the inaugural NBDL draft in 2001. He scored 33 points against the North Charleston Lowgators on 7 February, 2002. In his time with them, he averaged 17.1 points and 5.9 rebounds.

=== Purefoods TJ Hotdogs ===
In 2002, Muoneke came to the Philippines to play for a Champions for Christ team. He decided to stay in the country, which led to him becoming an import for the Purefoods TJ Hotdogs for that year's PBA Commissioner's Cup. Playing alongside another import in Kelvin Price, they were replaced midway through the elimination round by Warren Rosegreen and former NBA veteran Chris Morris. In six games with Purefoods, he averaged 28 points.

=== Roanoke Dazzle ===
On 1 October 2002, Muoneke was signed by the Detroit Pistons. On 25 October, he and Ricky Moore were waived.

On 18 January 2003, he scored 38 points against the Fayetteville Patriots. He was averaging 22.1 points and 8.8 rebounds in the NBDL with the Roanoke Dazzle before he left the team to play in Spain.

=== CB Cáceres ===
On 4 February 2003, CB Cáceres of the Spanish league LEB Oro finalized Muoneke's release from the Roanoke Dazzle and signed him as a replacement for Deon Thomas.

=== Saba Battery ===
In March 2007, Muoneke played for Saba Battery in Iran, helping them win the 2007 FIBA Asia Champions Cup.

=== Rio Grande Valley Vipers ===
In his time with the team, Muoneke averaged 26.2 points and 5.3 rebounds.

=== TAU Cerámica ===
On 26 December, 2007, Muoneke signed a three-month deal with TAU Cerámica of the Liga ACB to replace the injured James Singleton. When the contract expired, the team's renewal offer was not accepted by Muoneke and both parties mutually parted ways.

=== ASVEL Villeurbanne ===
After another stint with Saba Battery, in August of 2008, Muoneke signed with ASVEL Villeurbanne in France for the 2008–09 Pro A season. He did not stay long with the team, as he was released in September. He then signed with the Utah Jazz but was waived in October.

=== Yunnan Running Bulls ===
During his time in China, Muoneke broke many scoring records and was amongst the top scorers in China in all three of his seasons in the country. While playing for the Yunnan Running Bulls, Muoneke was physically attacked during a postgame confrontation between himself and Chinese national team captain and Shanghai Sharks player Liu Wei. After Muoneke and the Sharks' Cai Liang wrestled for the ball during the game, Cai, Liu and some Sharks players confronted Muoneke, his wife, children and mother-in-law as they were leaving the stadium. Muoneke had a water bottle thrown at him, before being chased and cornered by the players. Liu and Cai were subsequently fined and suspended. The Shanghai Sharks were also fined. Muoneke was not injured.

On his blog in 2009, he alluded to a retirement from professional basketball and subsequently did retire in 2010 at the age of 30.

== National team career ==
Muoneke was first called up to the Nigeria men's national basketball team in 2003 for the 2003 FIBA Africa Championship, where they finished second. He then played in the 2005 FIBA Africa Championship and the 2006 FIBA World Championship. He was then named captain for the team competing in the 2009 FIBA Africa Championship.

== Post-playing career ==
As he was playing overseas, Muoneke lay the groundwork for his energy industry plans by building connections with financiers and influencers. When he retired in 2009, he focused on his career in African oil and gas. He first joined Afren, a U.K.-based oil exploration and production company. He then started MTX, a Nigerian-based energy company.

== Personal life ==
Muoneke has been married to Lenea Muoneke. They have four children, Muo, Bianna, Arianna, and Zibem. Their son Muo played basketball for the Abilene Christian Wildcats while Bianna and Arianna played volleyball for the Georgia Bulldogs.

Muoneke is a born-again Christian. He received counseling for his outbursts in college which led to him embracing Christianity. His name Nnadubem means "God guide me".

Beginning in November 2007, Muoneke had been maintaining a blog on Hoopshype.com, where he discusses his playing career, life in foreign countries, and politics. His final blog post was published in 2011. He is capable of speaking seven languages, including Hebrew, and is also a Brazilian jiu-jitsu brown belt.

In 2013, Muoneke was arrested at George Bush Intercontinental Airport for bringing a knife. After 30 hours in two different jails, he was released on bail. The case was dismissed on 4 June of that year, as he had accidentally brought a kitchen knife, which he used to use for carving mangoes.
