= Rashad Anderson =

American basketball player (born 1983)

Personal information
- Born: November 9, 1983 (age 43) Lakeland, Florida, U.S.
- Listed height: 6 ft 5 in (1.96 m)
- Listed weight: 225 lb (102 kg)

Career information
- High school: Kathleen (Lakeland, Florida)
- College: UConn (2002–2006)
- NBA draft: 2006: undrafted
- Playing career: 2006–2017
- Position: Shooting guard / small forward

Career history
- 2006–2007: Aigaleo
- 2007–2008: TDShop.it Livorno
- 2008–2009: Snaidero Cucine Udine
- 2009–2010: Iowa Energy
- 2010: Fort Wayne Mad Ants
- 2010: Vanoli Cremona
- 2010–2011: Ventspils
- 2011–2012: Foolad Mahan Isfahan
- 2012: Zob Ahan Isfahan
- 2012: Amchit Club
- 2012–2013: Al Riyadi
- 2013: Cocodrilos de Caracas
- 2013: Champville
- 2013: Canton Charge
- 2014: Le Havre
- 2015: Enosis Neon Paralimni
- 2016: MAFC
- 2016: Promitheas Patras
- 2017: Hapoel Haifa

Career highlights
- NCAA champion (2004); Third-team Parade All-American (2002)

Rashad Shaheed Anderson (born November 9, 1983) is an American former professional basketball player. He played college basketball at the University of Connecticut.

== Early life ==
Rashad's first interest was baseball. His cousin introduced him to basketball when he was 10 years old. At age 13 he played on an AAU team that placed third in the nation. The following year on the 14 and under AAU team, they placed second in the country.

== High school career ==
At Kathleen High School in Lakeland, Florida, Anderson averaged 22.8 points a game and finished as the second leading scorer in school history. In his junior year at Kathleen, Anderson helped the Red Devils win the State Championship. As a senior, he was one of the top 50 recruits in the nation, he was named an All-American, leading his team to a 106–24 record in his four seasons.

== College career ==
Anderson chose UConn over the University of Florida, University of Tennessee, and University of Texas. He had a great career at UConn and was known as "the dagger" by UConn head coach Jim Calhoun because of his penchant for hitting shots at key moments of games. Anderson finished his career with 276 three-pointers, the most in UConn history.

=== Freshman ===
Anderson played in all 33 games, mostly coming off the bench, although he started in the last four contests of the regular season. He finished fourth on the squad with 8.2 ppg. His season high for points was 22 at Notre Dame which included 6 for 9 from beyond the arc.

=== Sophomore ===
In the 2004 season, Anderson finished as third leading scorer for NCAA champion Huskies with 11.2 ppg. He reached double figures in 19 total games on the season and was named to the NCAA Final Four All-Tournament Team after scoring 18 points vs. Georgia Tech in the Championship game and 14 points vs. Duke. In the NCAA Tournament he averaged 17.3 points and .488 from three-point range (21-of-43). His 21 threes set a UConn single-tournament record. Rashad scored 28 points in NCAA Elite Eight win over Alabama, matching the school-NCAA record of six three-pointers he set in First Round win over Vermont.

=== Junior ===
In his junior season, Anderson was placed in the starting role. He started 15 of 24 games at the shooting guard spot and finished as team's third leading scorer with 11.9 ppg. In February of that year, he was hospitalised for 13 days and missed seven games due to skin abscess in his right leg. He returned to action for the Big East Tournament. His season high for points was 27, including 16 in final 13 minutes, in a win over Rice.

=== Senior ===
Anderson was important off the bench as a senior and was the leading scorer among players not in the starting lineup. He earned All-Big East Honorable Mention honors, and averaged 12.8 points off the bench in 22.4 minutes of play. He reached double figures in 26 games. In one of the more memorable games of his collegiate career, Anderson scored the game-tying three-pointer at end of regulation against the Washington Huskies during the regional semifinals of the 2006 NCAA National Tournament sending the game into overtime with a score tied at 82. UConn went on to win in overtime, 98 to 92. Anderson ended that game with 19 points.

== Professional career ==
After going undrafted in the 2006 NBA draft, Anderson joined the Washington Wizards for the 2006 NBA Summer League. Later that year, he signed with Aigaleo of Greece for the 2006–07 Greek Basket League season.

In 2007, he signed with TDShop.it Livorno of Italy for the 2007–08 season.

Next season Anderson also stayed in Italy, where he joined top division's team Snaidero Udine, where he became league's leading scorer (18.2ppg) in 2008–09 Lega Basket Serie A season.

In November 2009, Anderson was selected by the Iowa Energy with the 9th pick of the 1st round in the 2009 NBA D-League draft. On January 9, 2010, he was waived by the Energy. On January 13, he was acquired by the Fort Wayne Mad Ants. On February 1, 2010, his contract was terminated by the Mad Ants. The next day, he signed with Vanoli Basket of Italy. Later that year, he signed with BK Ventspils of Latvia for the 2010–11 season. During 2011–12, Anderson spent time in Iran. In December 2012, he signed with Amchit Club of Lebanon. He later signed with Al Riyadi. In February 2013, Anderson signed with Cocodrilos de Caracas of Venezuela.

In April 2013, Anderson signed with Champville of Lebanon.

On November 1, 2013, he was acquired by the Texas Legends. On November 4, he was traded to the Canton Charge. On December 30, 2013, he was waived by the Charge. In January 2014, he signed with STB Le Havre of France.

On October 5, 2016, Anderson joined Promitheas Patras returning to the Greek Basket League after 10 years.
