= 2009 NBA Development League draft =

General information
- Sport: Basketball
- Date: November 5, 2009
- Location: Atlanta, Georgia

Overview
- League: NBA
- First selection: Carlos Powell, Albuquerque Thunderbirds

The 2009 NBA Development League draft was the ninth draft of the National Basketball Association Development League (NBADL). The draft was held on November 5, 2009, before the 2009–10 season. In this draft, all 16 of the league's teams took turns selecting eligible players. The D-League uses a "serpentine" format whereby the order of selections for each team alternates in each round. For example, the Albuquerque Thunderbirds won the number one overall selection, but in round two they picked last (16th selection, 32nd overall).

Carlos Powell of South Carolina was the first overall selection and was taken by Albuquerque Thunderbirds. Coincidentally, Powell had been selected second overall in the 2007 Draft, making him the only player to have been chosen as the first and second overall selections in D-League Draft history. Six players taken in the 2009 Draft had also previously been selected in an NBA draft: Deron Washington (2008), JamesOn Curry (2007), Latavious Williams (2010), Orien Greene (2005), Reece Gaines (2003) and Yaroslav Korolev (2005). Two players, Nate Miles and Brian Kortovich, played college basketball solely at the junior college level. The highest drafted international player was Amara Sy, who holds a dual citizenship with both Mali and France, as the Bakersfield Jam selected him fourth overall.

Although some of the players chosen in the 2009 NBA Development League Draft had played semi-professional and/or professional basketball after college graduation, only the United States colleges they attended are listed.

== Key ==
Pos.	G	F	C
Position	Guard	Forward	Center

^	Denotes player who has been selected to (an) NBA Development League All-Star Game(s)
*	Denotes player who has been selected to (an) NBA Development League All-Star Game(s) and was also selected in an NBA draft
†	Denotes player who was also selected in an NBA Draft

== Draft ==
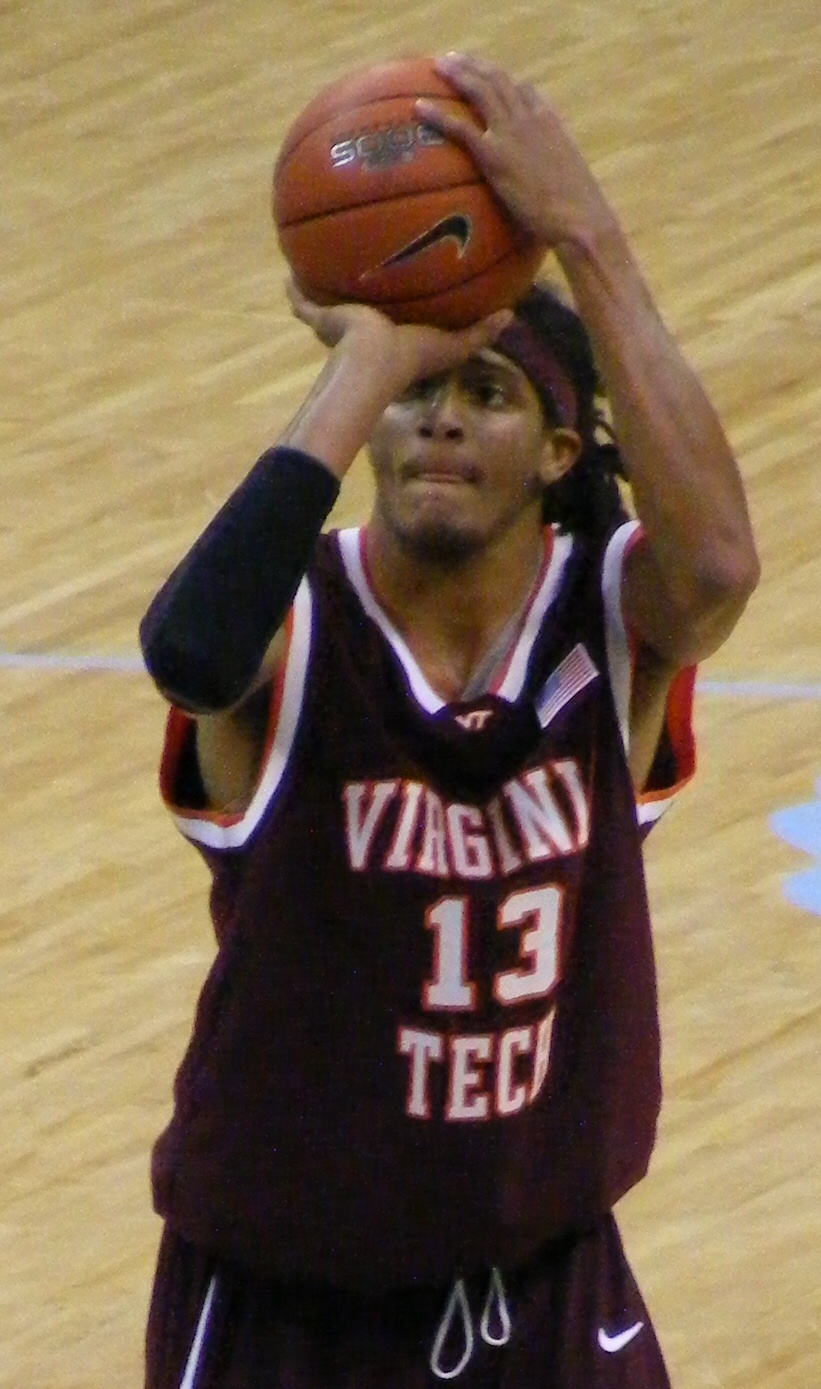
Deron Washington was also selected in the 2008 NBA draft by the Detroit Pistons.

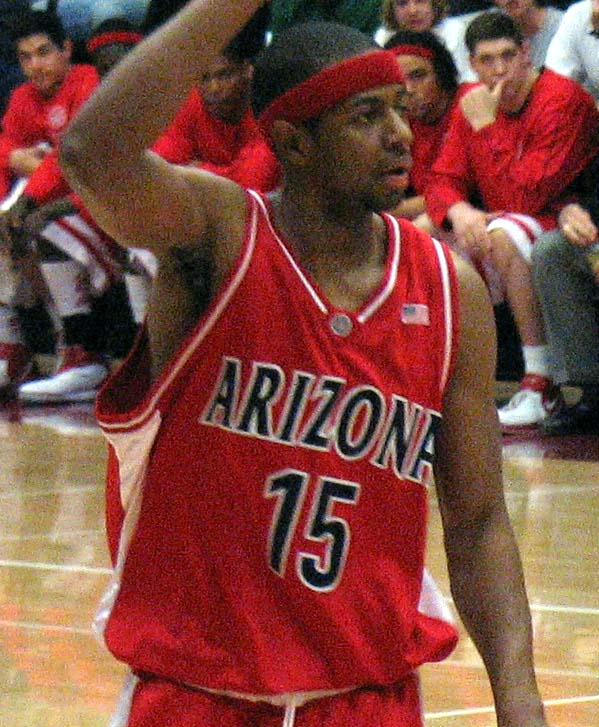
The Tulsa 66ers selected Mustafa Shakur 17th overall.

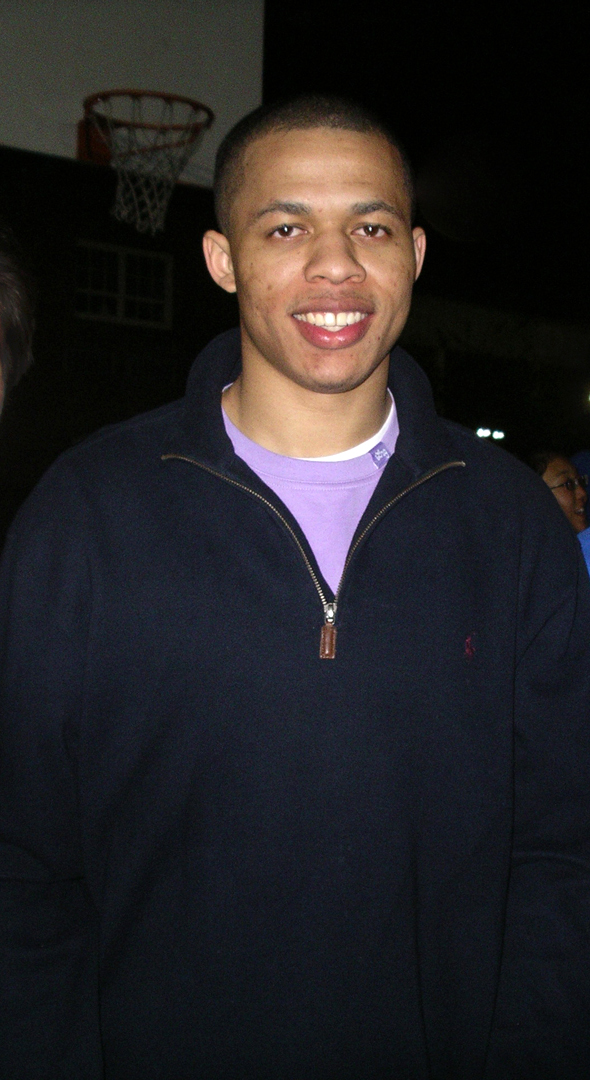
Jonathan Wallace played in college at Georgetown.

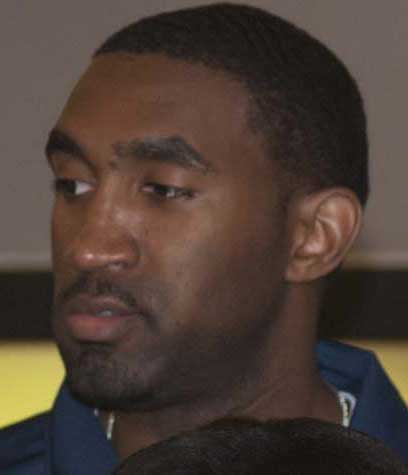
Darnell Lazare was selected 25th overall by the Maine Red Claws.

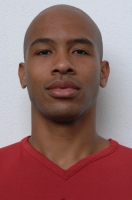
The Idaho Stampede took Delonte Holland with the 47th overall pick.

Round	Pick	Player	Position	Nationality	Team	College
1	1	Carlos Powell^	F	United States	Albuquerque Thunderbirds	South Carolina
1	2	Donell Taylor	G/F	United States	Erie BayHawks	UAB
1	3	Deron Washington^{†}	F	United States	Los Angeles D-Fenders	Virginia Tech
1	4	Amara Sy	F	Mali; France	Bakersfield Jam	—
1	5	Garret Siler	C	United States	Utah Flash	Augusta State
1	6	Alonzo Gee^	F	United States	Austin Toros	Alabama
1	7	Desmon Farmer^	G	United States	Reno Bighorns	Southern California
1	8	Paul Harris	F	United States	Maine Red Claws	Syracuse
1	9	Rashad Anderson	G/F	United States	Iowa Energy	Connecticut
1	10	Alade Aminu^	F/C	United States; Nigeria	Fort Wayne Mad Ants	Georgia Tech
1	11	Curtis Withers	F	United States	Dakota Wizards	UNC Charlotte
1	12	Antonio Anderson^	G	United States	Rio Grande Valley Vipers	Memphis
1	13	Raymond Sykes	F	United States	Sioux Falls Skyforce	Clemson
1	14	JamesOn Curry^{†}	G	United States	Springfield Armor	Oklahoma State
1	15	Sundiata Gaines^	G	United States	Idaho Stampede	Georgia
1	16	Latavious Williams^{†}	F	United States	Tulsa 66ers	—
2	17	Mustafa Shakur^	G	United States	Tulsa 66ers	Arizona
2	18	Dar Tucker	G	United States	Idaho Stampede	DePaul
2	19	Major Wingate	C	United States	Springfield Armor	Tennessee
2	20	Pete Campbell	F	United States	Sioux Falls Skyforce	Butler
2	21	Jonathan Wallace	G	United States	Rio Grande Valley Vipers	Georgetown
2	22	Doug Thomas	F	United States	Dakota Wizards	Iowa
2	23	Frank Tolbert	G/F	United States	Fort Wayne Mad Ants	Auburn
2	24	Pat Carroll	G	United States	Iowa Energy	Saint Joseph's
2	25	Darnell Lazare^	F	United States	Maine Red Claws	LSU
2	26	Haminn Quaintance	F	United States	Reno Bighorns	Kent State
2	27	Russell Carter	G	United States	Austin Toros	Notre Dame
2	28	Orien Greene*	G	United States	Utah Flash	Louisiana–Lafayette
2	29	Reece Gaines^{†}	G/F	United States	Bakersfield Jam	Louisville
2	30	Alan Wiggins Jr.	F/C	United States	Los Angeles D-Fenders	San Francisco
2	31	John Bryant	C	United States	Erie BayHawks	Santa Clara
2	32	Chad Toppert	G	United States; Germany	Albuquerque Thunderbirds	New Mexico
3	33	Erek Hansen	C	United States	Albuquerque Thunderbirds	Iowa
3	34	Martin Zeno	G	United States	Erie BayHawks	Texas Tech
3	35	Jeremy Wise	G	United States	Los Angeles D-Fenders	Southern Mississippi
3	36	Anthony Goods	G	United States	Bakersfield Jam	Stanford
3	37	Kevin Goffney	F	United States	Utah Flash	Chattanooga
3	38	Lewis Clinch	G	United States	Austin Toros	Georgia Tech
3	39	Chris Lowe	G	United States	Reno Bighorns	Massachusetts
3	40	Frank Young	G/F	United States	Maine Red Claws	West Virginia
3	41	Sean Barnette	G/F	United States	Iowa Energy	Wingate
3	42	Jamelle Cornley	F	United States	Fort Wayne Mad Ants	Penn State
3	43	Marcus Dove	F	United States	Dakota Wizards	Oklahoma State
3	44	Jamarcus Ellis	G	United States	Rio Grande Valley Vipers	Indiana
3	45	Reggie Williams^	F	United States	Sioux Falls Skyforce	VMI
3	46	James Cripe	C	United States	Springfield Armor	Northern Kentucky
3	47	Delonte Holland	F	United States	Idaho Stampede	DePaul
3	48	Cecil Brown	G	United States	Tulsa 66ers	Santa Barbara
4	49	Jeral Davis	C	United States	Tulsa 66ers	Talladega
4	50	T. J. Cummings	F	United States	Idaho Stampede	UCLA
4	51	Craig Austrie	G	United States	Springfield Armor	Connecticut
4	52	Leemire Goldwire	G	United States	Sioux Falls Skyforce	UNC Charlotte
4	53	Mickell Gladness	F/C	United States	Rio Grande Valley Vipers	Alabama A&M
4	54	D'Lancy Carter	C	United States	Dakota Wizards	St. Bonaventure
4	55	Booker Woodfox	G	United States	Fort Wayne Mad Ants	Creighton
4	56	Carl Mitchell	F	United States	Iowa Energy	Jarvis Christian
4	57	Gary Ervin	G	United States	Maine Red Claws	Arkansas
4	58	Louis Graham	F	United States	Reno Bighorns	Georgia Southern
4	59	Ira Brown	F	United States	Austin Toros	Gonzaga
4	60	Jason Richards	G	United States	Utah Flash	Davidson
4	61	Jared Newsom	G/F	United States	Bakersfield Jam	Tennessee–Martin
4	62	Christopher Hayes	F	United States	Los Angeles D-Fenders	Detroit
4	63	Derrick Mercer	G	United States	Erie BayHawks	American
4	64	Yaroslav Korolev^{†}	G/F	Russia	Albuquerque Thunderbirds	—
5	65	Shagari Alleyne	C	United States	Albuquerque Thunderbirds	Kentucky
5	66	Roderick Wilmont	G	United States	Erie BayHawks	Indiana
5	67	Christopher Moore	F	United States	Los Angeles D-Fenders	Virginia Union
5	68	Lance Hurdle	G	United States	Bakersfield Jam	Miami (FL)
5	69	Joe Darger	F	United States	Utah Flash	UNLV
5	70	David McClure	G/F	United States	Austin Toros	Duke
5	71	Terry Martin	G	United States	Reno Bighorns	LSU
5	72	Scooter McFadgon	G	United States	Maine Red Claws	Tennessee
5	73	Joah Tucker	G/F	United States	Iowa Energy	Milwaukee
5	74	Lenny Stokes	G/F	United States	Fort Wayne Mad Ants	Cincinnati
5	75	Jason Straight	G	United States	Dakota Wizards	Wyoming
5	76	Kenny Dawkins	G	United States	Rio Grande Valley Vipers	Lamar
5	77	Draelon Burns	G	United States	Sioux Falls Skyforce	DePaul
5	78	DeSean White	F	United States	Springfield Armor	Northwood
5	79	J. C. Mathis	F	United States	Idaho Stampede	Michigan
5	80	Mitchell Johnson	F	United States	Tulsa 66ers	Jarvis Christian
6	81	Keena Young	F	United States	Tulsa 66ers	Fayetteville State
6	82	Mike Gansey	G	United States	Idaho Stampede	West Virginia
6	83	Perrin Johnson	F	United States	Springfield Armor	Louisville
6	84	Nate Miles	G/F	United States	Sioux Falls Skyforce	Southern Idaho JC (Twin Falls, ID)
6	85	Antoine Hood	G	United States	Rio Grande Valley Vipers	Air Force
6	86	Darren Cooper	G	United States	Dakota Wizards	Portland
6	87	C. J. Anderson	G/F	United States	Fort Wayne Mad Ants	Xavier
6	88	Casey Love	F/C	United States	Iowa Energy	Robert Morris
6	89	Anthony Terrell	F	United States	Maine Red Claws	UNC Wilmington
6	90	Jermaine Johnson	F	United States	Reno Bighorns	College of Charleston
6	91	Quemont Greer^	F	United States	Austin Toros	DePaul
6	92	Travis Holmes	G	United States	Utah Flash	VMI
6	93	Chris Ayer	C	United States	Bakersfield Jam	Loyola Marymount
6	94	Charlie Parker	G	United States	Los Angeles D-Fenders	Millersville
6	95	Jeff Skemp	C	United States	Erie BayHawks	Wisconsin–Platteville
6	96	J'Nathan Bullock	F	United States	Albuquerque Thunderbirds	Cleveland State
7	97	Garrison Carr	G	United States	Albuquerque Thunderbirds	American
7	98	Ryan Troutman	G	United States	Erie BayHawks	Tusculum
7	99	Moustafa N'Doye	C	Senegal	Los Angeles D-Fenders	—
7	100	Ramon Dyer	F	United States	Bakersfield Jam	Houston
7	101	Alain LaRoche	F	United States	Utah Flash	North Florida
7	102	Augustine Okoson	C	Nigeria	Austin Toros	Northwood
7	103	Chris Davis	G	United States	Reno Bighorns	Southern U.
7	104	Tony Bobbitt	G	United States	Maine Red Claws	Cincinnati
7	105	Russell Hicks	C	Canada	Iowa Energy	Florida International
7	106	Andres Sandoval	G	Dominican Republic	Fort Wayne Mad Ants	Dayton
7	107	Rashaad Powell	F	United States	Dakota Wizards	Idaho
7	108	Rashad Woods	G/F	United States	Rio Grande Valley Vipers	Kent State
7	109	Rodney Alexander	F	United States	Sioux Falls Skyforce	Oklahoma City
7	110	Brandon Jones	F	United States	Springfield Armor	Amherst
7	111	Bryson McKenzie	C	United States	Idaho Stampede	Northern Illinois
7	112	Adam McCoy	G	United States	Tulsa 66ers	North Texas
8	113	Tim Parham	F	United States	Tulsa 66ers	Maryland–Eastern Shore
8	114	Vince Oliver	G	United States	Idaho Stampede	UC Davis
8	115	Brayden Billbe	C	United States	Springfield Armor	American
8	116	Lawrence McKenzie	G	United States	Sioux Falls Skyforce	Minnesota
8	117	DeAngelo Alexander	G	United States	Rio Grande Valley Vipers	UNC Charlotte
8	118	Jimmy Binnie	F	United States	Dakota Wizards	Dayton
8	119	A. J. Ratliff	G	United States	Fort Wayne Mad Ants	Indiana
8	120	Marcus Walker	G	United States	Iowa Energy	Colorado State
8	121	Matt Clement	F	United States	Maine Red Claws	Maine Maritime Academy
8	122	Ronald Allen	F/C	United States	Reno Bighorns	Cincinnati
8	123	D'mond Grismore	F	United States	Austin Toros	Huston–Tillotson
8	124	Jordan Brady	G/F	United States	Utah Flash	Utah Valley
8	125	Stephen McDowell	G	United States	Bakersfield Jam	Chattanooga
8	126	Travis Pinick	F	United States	Los Angeles D-Fenders	Yale
8	127	Zachary Sowers	G	United States	Erie BayHawks	William Jessup
8	128	Brian Kortovich	G	United States; Croatia	Albuquerque Thunderbirds	Cuyahoga CC (Cleveland, OH)

a: Amara Sy is a native of Mali and plays for their national team, but also holds dual citizenship with France.
b: Latavious Williams became the first player ever to skip college basketball and play a year in the D-League before getting drafted in the NBA, which adhered to the rule that players must be at least one year removed from high school in order to be eligible for an NBA draft.
c: Chad Toppert is American but is also eligible to play for the German national team because his grandfather is German.
d: Brian Kortovich became a dual citizen of Croatia in May 2010.
