= Marcus Walker (basketball) =

American basketball player (born 1986)

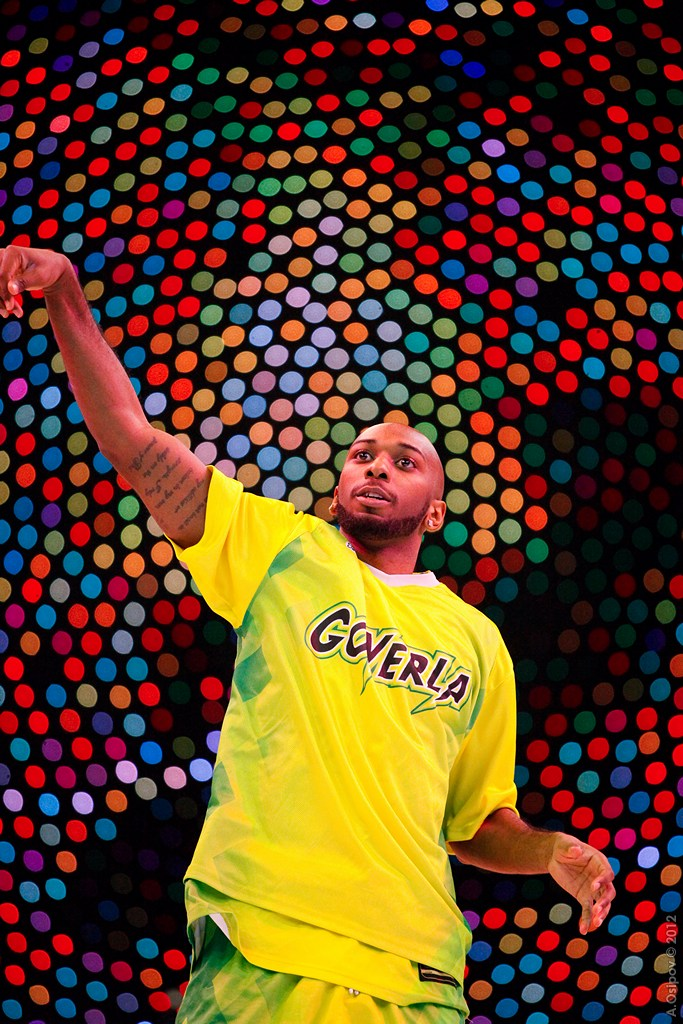

Personal information
- Born: August 22, 1986 (age 39) Kansas City, Missouri, U.S.
- Listed height: 183 cm (6 ft 0 in)
- Listed weight: 75 kg (165 lb)

Career information
- High school: Archbishop O'Hara (Kansas City, Missouri)
- College: Nebraska (2005–2006); Indian Hills (2006–2007); Colorado State (2007–2009)
- NBA Development League draft: 2009: 8th round, 120th overall pick
- Playing career: 2009–2012; 2017–2018
- Position: Point guard
- Number: 4, 10, 12, 13

Career history
- 2010–2011: KR
- 2011–2012: BC Goverla
- 2017: KR-b
- 2018: KR

Career highlights
- 2x Icelandic champion (2011, 2018); Icelandic Cup (2011); Úrvalsdeild Foreign Player of the year (2011); Úrvalsdeild Playoffs MVP (2011); Úrvalsdeild karla scoring champion (2011)

Marcus Walker (born August 22, 1986) is an American former professional basketball player. He led KR to the Icelandic championship and Icelandic Basketball Cup in 2011, and was named both the Úrvalsdeild Foreign Player of the year and the Úrvalsdeild Playoffs MVP.

== College ==
Walker joined Nebraska University in 2005 but left the school after one season, citing his desire to play in a more up-tempo offense. He played for Indian Hills during the 2006–2007 season before finishing his college career with Colorado State in 2009.

== Professional career ==
On November 1, 2009 Walker was selected 120th overall in the draft by the Iowa Energy of the NBA D-League.

In October 2010, Walker signed with KR of the Icelandic Úrvalsdeild karla. After a slow start, he ended by leading the league in scoring after averaging 23.2 points per game. In the playoffs, Walker helped KR to win the national championship with a dominant playoff performance. Walker averaged 32.5 points, made 67 percent of his three point shots 67 (14 of 21) and only had 2 turnovers in his 143 minutes in the finals series, where KR beat Stjarnan 3–1. He also set a new Úrvalsdeild playoff record by scoring 332 points in his 11 playoff games, breaking Damon Johnson's twelve year old record for most points scored in the playoffs.

Walker spent the 2011–2012 season with BC Goverla. For the season he averaged in the 14.0 points per game in the Ukrainian Basketball SuperLeague and 12.2 points per game in the FIBA EuroChallenge.

In July 2012, Walker signed with Basket Barcellona of the Italian Serie A2. He was however released in September after physical tests revealed he was suffering from an enlarged heart.

Walker came out of retirement in October 2017 when he joined KR's B-team to play with them in the Final 16 round of the Icelandic Basketball Cup. On November 3, Walker scored 42 points for KR-b in a 100–108 loss against Breiðablik in the cup. On April 14, it was announced that Walker had been called up to KR's A-team for the rest of the 2018 Úrvalsdeild playoffs due to injuries to Jón Arnór Stefánsson. In his first game, he scored 6 points in KR's semi-finals victory against Haukar. On April 28, Walker won his second Icelandic championship after KR defeated Tindastóll in the Úrvalsdeild finals.

== Honours ==
=== Iceland ===
==== Club ====
- Icelandic Champion (2): 2011, 2018
- Icelandic Cup: 2011

==== Individual ====
- Úrvalsdeild Foreign Player of the year: 2011
- Úrvalsdeild Playoffs MVP: 2011
- Úrvalsdeild karla scoring champion: 2011
