= Úrvalsdeild Men's Playoffs MVP =

Úrvalsdeild Men's Playoffs MVP is an Icelandic basketball award which is awarded annually to the player judged most valuable to his team during the Úrvalsdeild playoffs.

== Winners ==
The following is a list of the recent Úrvalsdeild Men's Playoffs MVP's.

§	Player's team lost the Úrvalsdeild Finals
Player (X)	Denotes the number of times the player has received the Playoffs MVP award
Team (X)	Denotes the number of times a player from this team has received the Playoffs MVP award

Year	Player	Position	Nationality	Team
1994–1995	Teitur Örlygsson	Forward	ISL	Njarðvík
2004–2005	Nick Bradford	Forward	USA	Keflavík
2005–2006	Brenton Birmingham	Guard	USA	Njarðvík
2006–2007	Tyson Patterson	Forward	USA	KR
2007–2008	Gunnar Einarsson	Guard	Iceland	Keflavík
2008–2009	Jón Arnór Stefánsson	Guard	Iceland	KR
2009–2010	Hlynur Bæringsson	Center	Iceland	Snæfell
2010–2011	Marcus Walker	Point guard	USA	KR
2011–2012	J'Nathan Bullock	Forward	USA	Grindavík
2012–2013	Aaron Broussard	Center	USA	Grindavík
2013–2014	Martin Hermannsson	Guard	Iceland	KR
2014–2015	Michael Craion	Center	USA	KR
2015–2016	Brynjar Þór Björnsson	Guard	Iceland	KR
2016–2017	Jón Arnór Stefánsson (2x)	Guard	Iceland	KR
2017–2018	Kristófer Acox	Forward	Iceland	KR
2018–2019	Julian Boyd	Forward	USA	KR
2020–2021	Adomas Drungilas	Center	LIT	Þór Þorlákshöfn
2021–2022	Kári Jónsson	Guard	ISL	Valur
2022–2023	Keyshawn Woods	Guard	USA	Tindastóll
2023–2024	Taiwo Badmus	Forward	IRL	Valur
2024–2025	Ægir Steinarsson	Guard	ISL	Stjarnan
2025–2026	Jeremy Pargo	Guard	USA	Grindavík
