= Devin Brown =

American basketball player (born 1978)

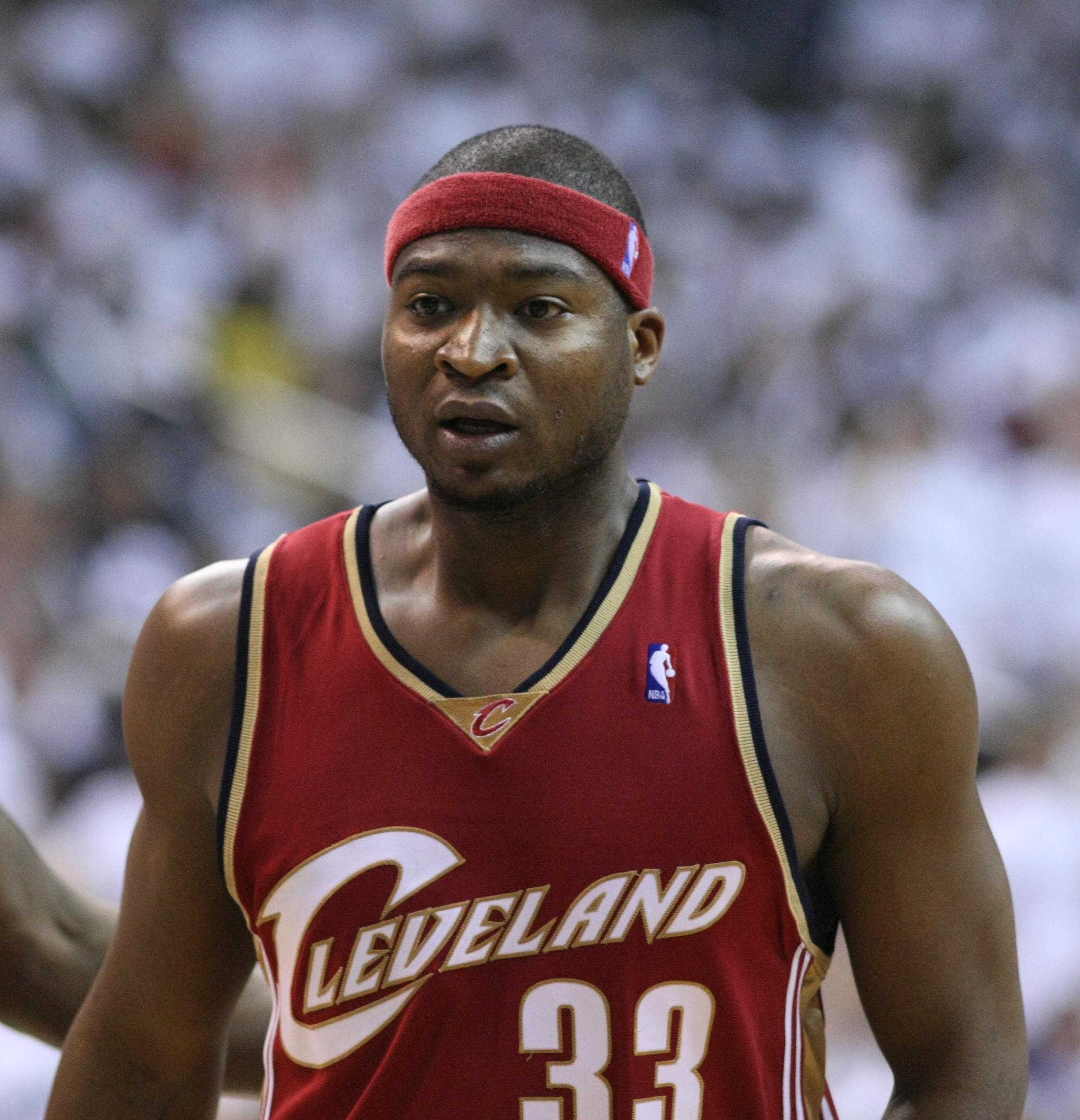
- Brown with the Cleveland Cavaliers in 2008

Personal information
- Born: December 30, 1978 (age 46) Salt Lake City, Utah, U.S.
- Listed height: 6 ft 5 in (1.96 m)
- Listed weight: 210 lb (95 kg)

Career information
- High school: South San Antonio West (San Antonio, Texas)
- College: UTSA (1998–2002)
- NBA draft: 2002: undrafted
- Playing career: 2002–2012
- Position: Shooting guard
- Number: 23, 14, 33, 32

Career history
- 2002: Kansas Cagerz
- 2002: San Antonio Spurs
- 2002–2003: Fayetteville Patriots
- 2003: Denver Nuggets
- 2003–2005: San Antonio Spurs
- 2005–2006: Utah Jazz
- 2006–2007: New Orleans/Oklahoma City Hornets
- 2007–2008: Cleveland Cavaliers
- 2008–2010: New Orleans Hornets
- 2010: Chicago Bulls
- 2011: Asseco Prokom
- 2012: Erie BayHawks

Career highlights
- NBA champion (2005); NBDL Most Valuable Player (2003); All-NBDL First Team (2003); NBDL Rookie of the Year (2003); 3× First-team All-Southland (2000–2002); Second-team All-Southland (1999); Southland Freshman of the Year (1999); No. 23 retired by UTSA Roadrunners
- Stats at NBA.com
- Stats at Basketball Reference

Devin LaVell Brown (born December 30, 1978) is an American former professional basketball shooting guard who played 8 seasons in the National Basketball Association. Brown won an NBA championship as a member of the San Antonio Spurs in 2005.

== Early life ==
Brown was born in Salt Lake City, Utah, and raised in San Antonio, Texas. He played organized basketball at South San Antonio West Campus High School, a school on the south side of San Antonio, where he became the all-time high school scorer in greater San Antonio.

== College career ==
Brown played four seasons at the University of Texas at San Antonio. He is the all-time leading scorer in school history with 1,922 career points. His collegiate averages were 18.3 points, 7.2 rebounds, 2.7 assists and 1.75 steals in 32.0 minutes. In addition to that, Brown was the first player in UTSA school history to record a triple double — a 33-point, 11-rebound, 11-assist performance — which he did on February 17, 2001, against the Louisiana–Monroe Indians. Brown was named Southland Conference Freshman of the Year in 1998–99 and named First Team All-Southland Conference three times. His was the first Roadrunner to have his number retired by UTSA.

== Professional career ==
=== Early years ===
Brown was not selected in the 2002 NBA draft. He was, however, the 6th overall pick in the CBA Draft by the Sioux Falls Skyforce and the 18th overall pick in the USBL Draft by the Kansas Cagerz. He was also drafted 2nd overall by Fayetteville Patriots in 2002 National Basketball Development League Draft.

Brown began his professional career with the Cagerz in 2002. During his rookie year, he averaged 17.3 points, 6.2 rebounds and won the USBL Rookie of the Year.

The following year Brown received an invite to the San Antonio Spurs' training camp. He was cut before the season started but then re-signed in November 2002 for two weeks during which he played in seven games.

Also in November 2002, Brown was drafted with the second overall pick of the then-named National Basketball Development League draft by the Fayetteville Patriots. He played 44 games for the Patriots and was named the 2003 NBDL Most Valuable Player as well as the 2003 NBDL Rookie of the Year. He averaged 16.9 points on 50% shooting, 4.1 rebounds and two assists in 24.7 minutes.

=== Denver Nuggets (2002–2003) ===
Brown earned a ten-day contract with the Denver Nuggets in April 2003, appearing in three games with two starts.

=== San Antonio Spurs (2003–2005) ===
After playing for the Spurs 2003 Summer League team, Brown signed with the team for the third time. Brown appeared in 58 games for the Spurs in 2003–04, logging major minutes as the season progressed and played a major role in the playoffs. In game six of the Western Conference Semifinals against the Los Angeles Lakers, Brown scored 15 points, 6 rebounds and three assists in a playoff-career-high 28 minutes.

Brown established career highs in all categories in the 2004–05 season while playing for the Spurs. In 67 games played, he averaged 7.4 points and 2.6 rebounds. With Brown, the Spurs won their third NBA Championship in June 2005. In the Finals, Brown saw the most game time in Game 4 with 20 minutes, but the Spurs lost that game to the Detroit Pistons 102–71. Brown scored 8 points on 2 for 8 field goal shooting and 1 for 3 free throw attempts and had three rebounds and two assists.

=== Utah Jazz (2005–2006) ===
On September 9, 2005, as a restricted free agent, Brown signed a two-year offer sheet with the Utah Jazz. The Spurs had the right to match the offer sheet but did not do so. During the 2005–2006 season, Brown played in 81 games for the Jazz (starting 14) and he averaged 7.5 points and 2.6 rebounds per game. On February 13, 2006, he scored a career high 25 points in a game against the Los Angeles Lakers.

=== Golden State Warriors (2006) ===
On July 12, 2006, the Jazz traded Brown, along with Keith McLeod and Andre Owens, to the Golden State Warriors for veteran guard Derek Fisher, but he was waived during training camp.

=== New Orleans Hornets (2006–2007) ===
On December 22, 2006, he signed with the New Orleans Hornets to help fill in gaps left by injuries to the team's major players. Brown played in 58 games for the Hornets (starting 49 of them), and averaged a career-high 11.6 points per game with and 4.3 rebounds. On April 10, 2007, Brown tied his career high by putting up 25 points against the Los Angeles Clippers.

=== Cleveland Cavaliers (2007–2008) ===
On September 29, 2007, he signed a one-year deal with the Cleveland Cavaliers. Brown played in 78 regular season games as a Cavalier (starting 20). He averaged 7.5 points, 3.4 rebounds and 2.2 assists, scoring a season-high 20 points against the Sacramento Kings on November 9, and was three assists away from a triple-double against the Washington Wizards on February 22, 2008. On April 2, he tied his season-high against the Charlotte Bobcats. He also had 5 rebounds and 8 assist as a starter in that game. Brown scored double digit points on 19 occasions and rebounds twice.

=== Return to New Orleans Hornets (2008–2010) ===
On August 22, 2008, he signed a two-year contract with the New Orleans Hornets.

=== Chicago Bulls (2010) ===
On January 25, 2010, Devin Brown was traded to the Chicago Bulls for Aaron Gray.

Brown's final NBA game was played in Game 4 of the 2010 Eastern Conference First Round on April 25, 2010, in a 98 - 121 loss to the Cleveland Cavaliers. Brown recorded 2 points and 1 rebound in his final game. The Bulls would go on to lose the entire series 4 - 1 (Game 4 was the only game of the series that Brown saw playing time).

=== Asseco Prokom (2011) ===
In September 2011, Brown signed with Asseco Prokom in Poland. He was released by Asseco Prokom in October 2011.

== Honors, rankings and milestones ==
2002 USBL Rookie of the Year

2003 NBDL Rookie of the Year

2003 NBDL Most Valuable Player

On April 14, 2007, Brown scored his 2,000th NBA career point in a game against the Houston Rockets.

On April 27, 2007, Brown had his number 14 retired by the Kansas Cagerz of the USBL.

On March 6, 2008, Brown had his 500th NBA career assist in a game against the New York Knicks. On March 21, he scored his 2,500th NBA career point in a game against the Toronto Raptors, grabbing his 1,000th NBA career rebound against the Philadelphia 76ers nine days later.

== NBA career statistics ==
Legend
GP	Games played	GS	Games started	MPG	Minutes per game
FG%	Field goal percentage	3P%	3-point field goal percentage	FT%	Free throw percentage
RPG	Rebounds per game	APG	Assists per game	SPG	Steals per game
BPG	Blocks per game	PPG	Points per game	**Bold**	Career high
†	Won an NBA championship

=== Regular season ===
Year	Team	GP	GS	MPG	FG%	3P%	FT%	RPG	APG	SPG	BPG	PPG
2002–03	San Antonio	7	0	3.1	**.500**	.000	**1.000**	1.0	.3	.0	.0	1.7
2002–03	Denver	3	2	23.7	.280	.000	.667	3.7	1.7	**1.3**	**.3**	6.0
2003–04	San Antonio	58	0	10.8	.434	.286	.811	2.2	.6	.3	.1	4.0
2004–05†	San Antonio	67	0	18.5	.423	**.372**	.792	2.6	1.4	.6	.2	7.4
2005–06	Utah	**81**	14	21.1	.393	.331	.745	2.6	1.3	.5	.2	7.5
2006–07	NO/Oklahoma City	58	**49**	**28.7**	.420	.357	.794	**4.3**	**2.6**	.8	.2	**11.6**
2007–08	Cleveland	78	20	22.6	.409	.308	.754	3.4	2.2	.7	.1	7.5
2008–09	New Orleans	63	5	13.8	.355	.289	.780	1.9	.9	.5	.1	5.2
2009–10	New Orleans	39	37	24.8	.394	.367	.802	2.8	1.5	.8	.1	9.7
2009–10	Chicago	11	0	8.5	.222	.235	.000	1.4	.6	.3	.1	1.8
Career		465	127	19.4	.401	.338	.776	2.8	1.5	.6	.1	7.2

=== Playoffs ===
Year	Team	GP	GS	MPG	FG%	3P%	FT%	RPG	APG	SPG	BPG	PPG
2004	San Antonio	9	0	**14.4**	.486	**.600**	.588	2.0	1.0	**.3**	**.1**	**5.8**
2005†	San Antonio	**12**	0	5.0	.350	.429	.571	.6	.3	.1	.0	1.8
2008	Cleveland	8	0	11.5	.265	.294	.667	**2.4**	**1.1**	.2	.0	4.1
2009	New Orleans	3	0	11.0	.375	.000	**1.000**	1.7	.0	.0	.0	2.7
2010	Chicago	1	0	2.0	**1.000**	.000	.000	1.0	.0	.0	.0	2.0
Career		33	0	9.6	.380	.368	.619	1.5	.6	.2	.0	3.5
