= Carlos Powell =

American basketball player

Personal information
- Born: August 29, 1983 (age 43) Florence, South Carolina, U.S.
- Listed height: 6 ft 7 in (2.01 m)
- Listed weight: 225 lb (102 kg)

Career information
- High school: Wilson (Florence, South Carolina)
- College: South Carolina (2001–2005)
- NBA draft: 2005: undrafted
- Playing career: 2005–2017
- Position: Forward

Career history
- 2005–2006: Benfica
- 2006–2007: New Zealand Breakers
- 2007: Azovmash Mariupol
- 2007–2008: Dakota Wizards
- 2008–2009: Incheon ET Land Black Slamer
- 2009–2010: Albuquerque Thunderbirds
- 2010–2011: Liaoning Dinosaurs
- 2011: Zob Ahan Isfahan
- 2011: Maccabi Haifa
- 2012–2015: Incheon Elephants
- 2015–2016: Jeonju KCC Egis
- 2016–2017: Estudiantes Concordia
- 2017: Trotamundos

Career highlights
- Venezuelan League MVP (2017); 2x NBA D-League All-Star (2008, 2010); All-NBA D-League Third Team (2008); All-NBL First Team (2007); NBL scoring champion (2007); NIT Most Valuable Player (2005); Second-team All-SEC (2005)

Ricardo Auturo "Carlos" Powell (born August 29, 1983) is an American former professional basketball player.

He is notable for receiving the NIT Most Valuable Player award, in the NIT tournament. Other honors he has received include 2003-2004 All SEC, 2004-2005 Preseason All SEC, and 2005 Team outstanding rebounder. Throughout his four-year career, he scored over 1500 points (1541), 600 rebounds (641), and 70 3-point field goals (71). He also holds the school record for most games played with 132.

== Professional career ==
After college, Powell played professionally for Benfica in Portugal where he was the fourth leading scorer in the league with 19.4 points and 7 rebounds a game. He was subsequently named to the All-League MVP team and all league imports first team.

Powell played for the New Zealand Breakers of the Australian National Basketball League during the 2006–2007 season. He shone in his debut with the Breakers, scoring 34 points against the South Dragons. Powell was arguably the team's best player throughout the 06–07 season, leading the league in points scored with 28.3 per game. He was also top 10 in the league in steals, and won the 06-07 slam-dunk competition at the NBL All-Star game.

Powell played for the Golden State Warriors in the NBA Summer League in 2007. After failing to secure a contract, he was signed by the Ukrainian team Azovmash Mariupol.

On November 1, 2007, Powell was selected 2nd overall in the 2007 NBA D-League draft by the Dakota Wizards. For the Wizards, he was selected to participate in the 2008 NBA D-League All-Star Game and he finished the season averaging 22.5 points, 6.4 rebounds, 4.8 assists, and 1.4 steals per game in 48 games played.

On November 1, 2009, Powell was selected 1st overall in the 2009 NBA D-League draft by the Albuquerque Thunderbirds. He was selected to participate in the 2010 NBA D-League All-Star Game, but he did not stay in the D-League for the entire 2009-2010 season. He finished the season in the CBL with the Liaoning Panpan Hunters, where he averaged 25 points and 6.6 rebounds per game.

In 2011, Powell played for Zob Ahan Isfahan of the IBSL in Isfahan, Iran, averaging 20 points, 12 rebounds and 3.5 assists per game.

In August 2011, he signed with Maccabi Haifa B.C. in Israel.

He returned to the Incheon Elephants in South Korea for the 2012-13 KBL season.

He was again signed by Incheon ET Land Elephants for 2013-2014 KBL season.

In February 2017, Powell signed with Trotamundos. In July 2017, Powell was named Most Valuable Player of the 2017 Liga Profesional de Baloncesto season.
