= Mikki Moore =

American basketball player (born 1975)

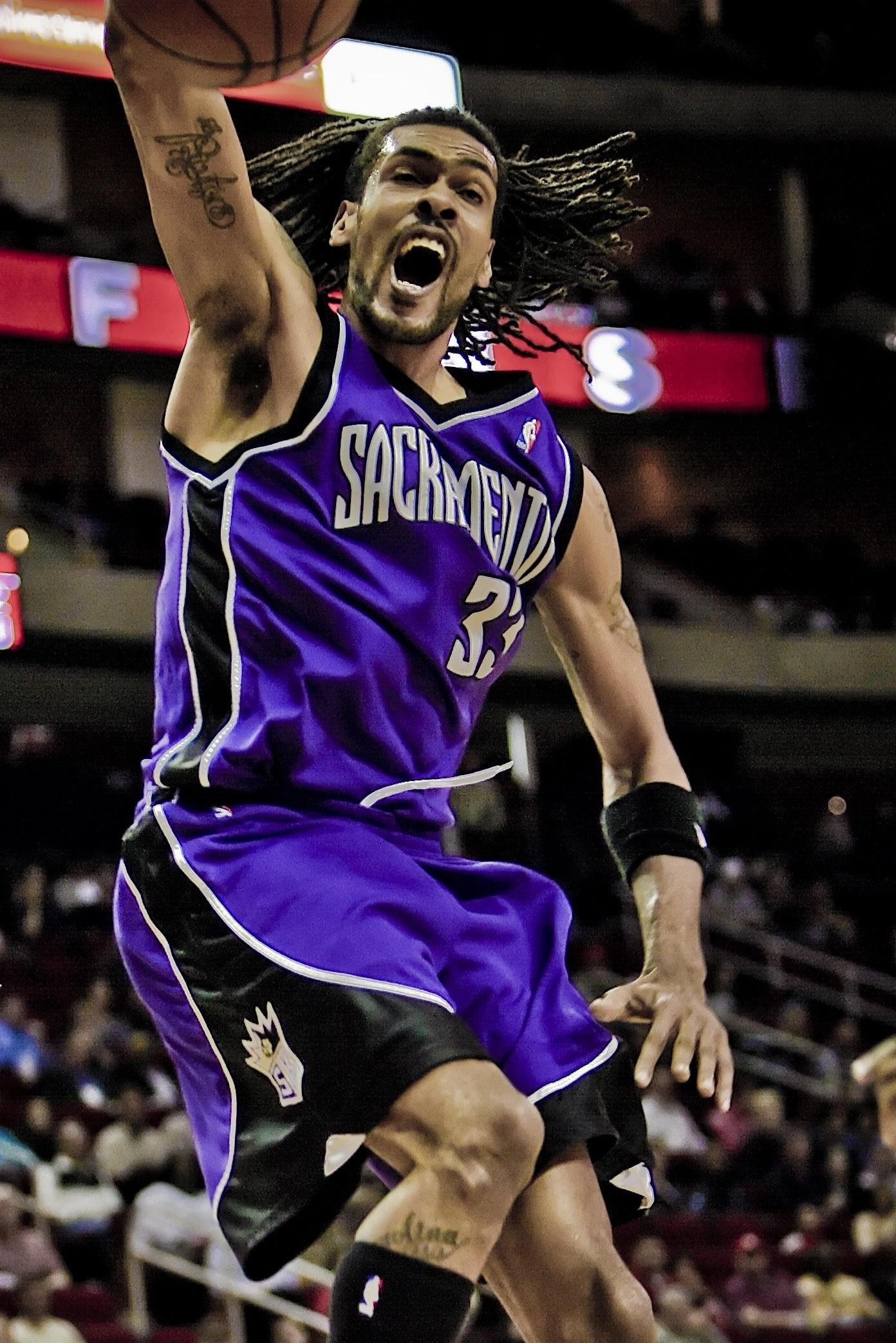
- Moore with the Sacramento Kings in 2008

Personal information
- Born: November 4, 1975 (age 51) Gaffney, South Carolina, U.S.
- Listed height: 7 ft 0 in (2.13 m)
- Listed weight: 225 lb (102 kg)

Career information
- High school: Blacksburg (Blacksburg, South Carolina)
- College: Nebraska (1993–1997)
- NBA draft: 1997: undrafted
- Playing career: 1997–2013
- Position: Center
- Number: 31, 38, 45, 54, 33, 7

Career history
- 1997–1998: Fort Wayne Fury
- 1998: Papagou
- 1999: Detroit Pistons
- 1999: Fort Wayne Fury
- 1999–2002: Detroit Pistons
- 2002–2003: Roanoke Dazzle
- 2003: Boston Celtics
- 2003: Atlanta Hawks
- 2003–2004: Roanoke Dazzle
- 2004: Utah Jazz
- 2004–2005: Los Angeles Clippers
- 2005–2006: Seattle SuperSonics
- 2006–2007: New Jersey Nets
- 2007–2009: Sacramento Kings
- 2009: Boston Celtics
- 2009–2010: Golden State Warriors
- 2012: Idaho Stampede
- 2012: Golden State Warriors
- 2013: Reno Bighorns

Career highlights
- Greek League All-Star (1998); All-NBDL First Team (2003); NBDL Defensive Player of the Year (2003); All-CBA First Team (1999); CBA All-Defensive Team (1999); CBA All-Rookie First Team (1998)
- Stats at NBA.com
- Stats at Basketball Reference
Medals
Men's basketball
Representing United States
Pan American Games
Silver medal – second place	1999 Winnipeg	National team

Clinton Renard "Mikki" Moore (pronounced "MY-key"; born November 4, 1975) is an American former professional basketball player. He played college basketball for the Nebraska Cornhuskers.

== Early life and college ==
Born in Orangeburg, South Carolina, Moore graduated from Blacksburg High School at Blacksburg, South Carolina in 1993.

Moore played at the University of Nebraska–Lincoln. He averaged 8.6 ppg (.553 FG%, .250 3pt%, .655 FT%), 5.8 rpg, and 2.10 bpg in 25.0 mpg in 114 games in four seasons at Nebraska (1993–1997). He ranks second in Cornhusker history in career blocked shots (236), trailing only Venson Hamilton (241), while also ranking seventh in school annals in career field goal percentage. Posted 11.7 ppg (.583 FG%, 1-2 3pt, .701 FT%), 7.4 rpg, 1.3 apg, and 2.67 bpg in 33 contests as a senior (1996–97), ranking second on the team in scoring and rebounding. He helped Nebraska to the school's first basketball championship of any kind as a junior in 1995–96, registering 11 points (4-9 FG, 3-5 FT), a game-high 13 rebounds, and one block in a 60–56 win vs. St. Joseph's in the 1996 NIT title game. Mikki was also known to be an excellent hacky-sack player, and would routinely join hack-circles outside of the Harper-Schramm-Smith Residence Hall.

== Professional career ==
Moore went undrafted following a career at the University of Nebraska–Lincoln, where he left as the all-time leader in blocked shots. He is a journeyman player, having played for nine different NBA teams (Detroit Pistons, Atlanta Hawks, Boston Celtics, New Jersey Nets, Utah Jazz, Los Angeles Clippers, Seattle SuperSonics, Sacramento Kings, Golden State Warriors). He has also had stints playing overseas as well as other professional leagues in the U.S. such as the Continental Basketball Association and the NBA Development League, where he played for the Roanoke Dazzle. He was drafted 1st overall by Roanoke Dazzle in the 2002 NBA D-League Draft. Most notably, he enjoyed All-NBA D-League First Team and NBA D-League Defensive Player of the Year honors during the 2002–03 season. Moore was selected to the CBA All-Rookie Team in 1998, and the All-CBA First Team and All-Defensive Team in 1999.

=== New Jersey Nets (2006–2007) ===
On July 27, 2006, Moore was traded by the Sonics to the New Jersey Nets in exchange for a 2009 2nd round pick (Derrick Brown was selected with the pick). Following a season-ending ACL injury to center Nenad Krstić, Moore was called upon to play major minutes and had one of the best years of his NBA career, averaging career highs of 9.8 points per game and 5.1 rebounds per game, plus a league-leading .609 field goal percentage, becoming the first undrafted player ever to lead the NBA in field goal percentage, and only the third to finish in the top five since the 1976–77 season.

=== Sacramento Kings (2007–2009) ===
On July 21, 2007, Moore signed a multi-year deal with the Sacramento Kings. On February 19, 2009, he was waived by the Kings.

=== Boston Celtics (2009) ===
On February 24, 2009, he signed with the Boston Celtics.

=== Golden State Warriors (2009–2010) ===
On September 2, 2009, Moore signed with the Golden State Warriors to a reported one-year, $1.3 million deal. On January 4, 2010, after undergoing surgery for a bone spur in his right heel, Moore was waived by the Warriors.

=== Memphis Grizzlies (2011) ===
On December 9, 2011, he signed with the Memphis Grizzlies. However, he was waived on December 16.

=== Idaho Stampede (2012) ===
In January 2012, he was acquired by the Idaho Stampede.

=== Golden State Warriors (2012) ===
On April 16, 2012, he re-signed with the Warriors for the rest of the 2011–12 season.

=== Philadelphia 76ers (2012) ===
On October 1, 2012, he was signed with the Philadelphia 76ers. However, he was waived on October 10.

=== NBA D-League (2013) ===
On November 1, 2013, he was re-acquired by the Idaho Stampede. On November 4, 2013, he was traded to the Reno Bighorns. On December 19, 2013, he was waived by the Bighorns.

== NBA career statistics ==
Legend
GP	Games played	GS	Games started	MPG	Minutes per game
FG%	Field goal percentage	3P%	3-point field goal percentage	FT%	Free throw percentage
RPG	Rebounds per game	APG	Assists per game	SPG	Steals per game
BPG	Blocks per game	PPG	Points per game	**Bold**	Career high
*	Led the league

=== Regular season ===
Year	Team	GP	GS	MPG	FG%	3P%	FT%	RPG	APG	SPG	BPG	PPG
1998–99	Detroit	2	0	3.0	**1.000**	.000	**1.000**	.5	.0	.0	.0	2.0
1999–00	Detroit	29	0	16.8	.621	.000	.794	3.9	.6	.3	**1.1**	7.9
2000–01	Detroit	81	2	14.2	.493	.000	.731	3.9	.4	.3	.8	4.4
2001–02	Detroit	30	0	7.2	.475	**.500**	.769	1.8	.4	.2	.3	2.6
2002–03	Boston	3	0	4.0	.000	.000	.000	.3	.0	.0	.7	.0
2002–03	Atlanta	5	0	6.2	.417	.000	.800	1.4	.6	.0	.4	3.6
2003–04	New Jersey	4	0	2.5	.200	.000	.000	.5	.0	.0	.0	.5
2003–04	Utah	28	0	13.8	.521	.000	.857	2.9	.7	.3	.5	4.6
2004–05	L.A. Clippers	74	4	15.9	.502	.200	.787	3.3	.6	.3	.4	5.4
2005–06	Seattle	47	1	12.4	.435	.000	.742	2.8	.6	.1	.3	3.3
2006–07	New Jersey	79	55	26.4	.609*	.000	.681	5.1	.9	**.6**	.8	**9.8**
2007–08	Sacramento	**82***	**79**	**29.1**	.577	.000	.736	**6.0**	1.0	.4	.6	8.5
2008–09	Sacramento	46	20	16.2	.521	.000	.810	3.3	.6	.3	.3	3.5
2008–09	Boston	24	0	19.0	.600	.000	.737	4.4	1.0	.2	.2	4.8
2009–10	Golden State	23	20	17.7	.600	.000	.636	3.0	**1.6**	.2	.6	5.0
2011–12	Golden State	7	0	16.9	.450	.000	.857	3.1	.7	.4	.4	3.4
Career		564	181	18.2	.551	.154	.743	3.9	.7	.3	.5	5.8

=== Playoffs ===
Year	Team	GP	GS	MPG	FG%	3P%	FT%	RPG	APG	SPG	BPG	PPG
2000	Detroit	3	0	14.0	.417	.000	**1.000**	4.0	1.0	.3	.0	6.0
2007	New Jersey	**12**	**12**	**33.3**	**.560**	.000	.793	**5.6**	**1.2**	**.8**	**.6**	**11.3**
2009	Boston	10	0	6.6	.500	.000	.833	1.5	.4	.2	.5	1.5
Career		25	12	20.3	.541	.000	.837	3.8	.8	.5	.5	6.7
