= Roanoke Dazzle =

- League: NBA Development League
- Founded: 2001
- Folded: 2006
- History: Roanoke Dazzle; 2001–2006
- Arena: Roanoke Civic Center
- Location: Roanoke, Virginia
- Team colors: blue, yellow, white
- Head coach: Kent Davison
- Ownership: NBA
- Affiliations: New Jersey Nets; Philadelphia 76ers Washington Wizards
- Championships: none
Home	Away	Third

The Roanoke Dazzle were an NBA Development League team based in Roanoke, Virginia, U.S. In operation from the inaugural D-League season of 2001–02 through the 2005–06 season, the Dazzle marked the return of professional basketball to Roanoke since the Virginia Squires called Roanoke home in the 1970s. Playing their home games at the Roanoke Civic Center, their logo design featured a star, a reference to the Roanoke Star, moving on rail tracks around a basketball.

== Franchise history ==
The NBDL initially announced that Roanoke was under consideration for one of the inaugural teams in August 2000. Competing with Hampton for Virginia's NBDL team, Roanoke was evaluated as a potential franchise location based on its population, arena size and lack of a major NCAA basketball program in the Roanoke Valley. After reaching an agreement to play home games at the Roanoke Civic Center, the NBDL announced Roanoke as the league's fifth member on May 18, 2001. The announcement marked the return of professional basketball to Roanoke since the departure of the American Basketball Association's Virginia Squires following the 1972–73 season.

By June 2001, Donna Daniels was named team president and Kent Davison was announced as the first head coach in franchise history. On July 18, 2001, Daniels announced the team nickname, the Dazzle. The name was chosen purposefully to not reflect Roanoke's railroad heritage as two other professional teams, the Roanoke Express and the Roanoke Steam, already called the civic center home. The Dazzle would be victorious in the inaugural game on November 18, 2001, against the Mobile Revelers in the Roanoke Civic Center.

After five seasons, and overall moderate success on the court, the Dazzle were one of the final two teams from the NBDL inaugural season to last through the 2005–06 season. The Fayetteville Patriots were the other. Both were owned by the NBA for their entire five season history. On May 1, 2006, the NBA Development League announced that the NBA would no longer operate the Roanoke Dazzle. League President Phil Evans briefly held out the possibility of a local ownership group operating the team. However, when a local ownership group failed to materialize, the team was disbanded.

== Season-by-season results ==
Season	Regular Season				Playoffs
Season	Finish	Wins	Losses	Pct.	Playoffs
Roanoke Dazzle
2001–02	8th	18	38	.320	
2002–03	4th	26	24	.520	Lost Semifinals (Fayetteville) 2–0
2003–04	5th	20	26	.435	
2004–05	4th	26	22	.542	Lost Semifinals (Columbus) 96–89
2005–06	4th	25	23	.521	Lost Semifinals (Fort Worth) 87–78
Regular Season Record		115	133	.464	2001–2006
Playoff Record		0	3	.000	2001–2006

== Players of note ==
- Cory Alexander–San Antonio Spurs
- Andray Blatche–Washington Wizards
- Will Bynum–Detroit Pistons
- Matt Carroll–Charlotte Bobcats
- D'or Fischer
- Anthony Grundy–Atlanta Hawks
- Mikki Moore–Sacramento Kings
- Gabe Muoneke–Saba Battery Tehran BC of the Iranian Basketball Super League
- Peter John Ramos–Washington Wizards
- Andreas Glyniadakis–Maroussi BC of the Greek A1 League
- Curtis Staples–Chicago Bulls

== NBA affiliates ==
- New Jersey Nets (2005–2006)
- Philadelphia 76ers (2005–2006)
- Washington Wizards (2005–2006)

== See also ==
- Richmond Rhythm
- Virginia Squires
