= Úrvalsdeild Women's Coach of the Year =

The Women's Coach of the Year is an award for the top-tier basketball league in Iceland, the women's Úrvalsdeild.

== All-time award winners ==
The following is a list of the all-time Úrvalsdeild Women's Coach of the Year winners.

Season	Player	Team
1995-1996	(United States) Suzette Sargeant	Njarðvík
1996-1997	(Canada) Antonio Vallejo	ÍR
1997-1998	(Iceland) Karl Jónsson	ÍR
1998-1999	(Iceland) Óskar Kristjánsson	KR
1999-2000	(Iceland) Ósvaldur Knúdsen	ÍS
2000-2001	(Iceland) Henning Henningsson	KR
2001-2002	(Iceland) Anna María Sveinsdóttir	Keflavík
2002-2003	(Iceland) Einar Árni Jóhannsson	Njarðvík
2003-2004	(Iceland) Gréta María Grétarsdóttir	KR
2004-2005	(Iceland) Ágúst Björgvinsson	Haukar
2005-2006	(Iceland) Ágúst Björgvinsson (2x)	Haukar
2006-2007	(Iceland) Ágúst Björgvinsson (3x)	Haukar
2007-2008	(Iceland) Jón Halldór Eðvaldsson	Keflavík
2008-2009	(Iceland) Jóhannes Árnason	KR
2009-2010	(Iceland) Benedikt Guðmundsson	KR
2010-2011	(Iceland) Jón Halldór Eðvaldsson (2x)	Keflavík
2011-2012	(Iceland) Sverrir Þór Sverrisson	Njarðvík
2012-2013	(Iceland) Sigurður Ingimundarson	Keflavík
2013–2014	(Iceland) Ingi Þór Steinþórsson	Snæfell
2014–2015	(Iceland) Ingi Þór Steinþórsson (2x)	Snæfell
2015–2016	(Iceland) Ingi Þór Steinþórsson (3x)	Snæfell
2016–2017	(Iceland) Sverrir Þór Sverrisson (2x)	Keflavík
2017–2018	(Iceland) Ingvar Guðjónsson	Haukar
2018–2019	(Iceland) Benedikt Guðmundsson (2x)	KR
2019–2020	None selected after season was canceled due to the coronavirus pandemic in Iceland	
2020–2021	(Iceland) Ólafur Jónas Sigurðsson	Valur
2021–2022	(Iceland) Bjarni Magnússon	Haukar
2022–2023	(Iceland) Ólafur Jónas Sigurðsson	Valur
