= Björg Hafsteinsdóttir =

Icelandic basketball player (born 1969)

Linda Stefánsdóttir
Personal information
- Born: 22 October 1969 (age 57) Keflavík, Iceland
- Listed height: 170 cm (5 ft 7 in)

Career information
- Playing career: 1985–1997
- Position: Guard
- Number: 10

Career history

Playing
- 1985–1992: Keflavík
- 1992: KR
- 1993–1997: Keflavík

Coaching
- 1997–1998: Keflavík (assistant)

Career highlights
- As player: Icelandic Team of the 20th century; Úrvalsdeild Domestic Player of the Year (1990); 6× Úrvalsdeild Domestic All-First Team (1988–1992, 1995); 7× Icelandic champion (1988–1990, 1992–1994, 1996); 8× Icelandic Cup (1988–1990, 1993–1997); As assistant coach: Icelandic champion (1998); Icelandic Cup (1998)

Career Úrvalsdeild kvenna statistics
- Points: 2,599 (12.9 ppg)
- Games: 201

Björg Hafsteinsdóttir (born 22 October 1969) is an Icelandic former basketball player and a former member of the Icelandic national basketball team. She played 12 seasons in the Úrvalsdeild kvenna, winning the Icelandic championship seven times and the Icelandic Basketball Cup eight times. In 2001 she was named one of the twelve players of the Icelandic basketball team of the 20th century by the Icelandic Basketball Federation. She was a six time Úrvalsdeild Domestic All-First Team selection and was named the league's Player of the Year in 1990. She spent the vast majority of her career with Keflavík, outside of a few months in the fall of 1992 when she played for KR. One of the first great Icelandic three-point shooters, she set several national three-point shooting records during her career.

== Early life ==
Björg was born in Keflavík where she started playing basketball with the junior boys team at the age of around 10–11. In her youth, she also played football and handball.

== Basketball ==
=== Club career ===
She played her first senior team game on 10 October 1985 where she scored 7 point in a victory against KR. On 6 January 1994, she scored a career high 41 points in a 185–30 victory against ÍR. She retired from basketball following Keflavík's loss against eventual champions Grindavík in the 1997 playoffs.

Following her retirement from playing, she served as an assistant coach to Anna María Sveinsdóttir for Keflavík during the 1997–1998 season, helping the team to the national championship and the Icelandic Cup.

=== National team career ===
Between 1986 and 1997, Björg played 33 games for the Icelandic national basketball team.

== Football ==
Björg played for Keflavík's football team as a goalkeeper. In 1991, when the team was playing in the second-tier 2. deild kvenna, she helped the team to the Icelandic Football Cup finals after beating top-tier teams Breiðablik, where she saved two penalties in a penalty shootout, and Þór Akureyri in the previous rounds. In the finals, Keflavík lost 1–6 against ÍA.

== Personal life ==
Björg is the mother of basketball player Thelma Dís Ágústsdóttir.
