= 1998–99 Úrvalsdeild kvenna (basketball) =

41st season of Iceland women's basketball league

VÍS-deildin^{1}
- Duration: October 3, 1998 – April 3, 1999
- Teams: 6

Regular season
- Top seed: KR
- Relegated: ÍR, Njarðvík

Finals
- Champions: KR (11th title)
- Runners-up: Keflavík
- Semi-finalists: ÍS, Grindavík

Awards
- Domestic MVP: (Iceland) Anna María Sveinsdóttir
- Foreign MVP: (Israel) Limor Mizrachi

Statistical leaders
Points	(Iceland) Guðbjörg Norðfjörð	15.1
Rebounds	(Iceland) Signý Hermannsdóttir	10.5
Assists	(Iceland) Alda Leif Jónsdóttir	5.0

Records
- Winning streak: KR; 20 games
- ^{1} Sponsored league name, referring to Úrvalsdeild kvenna.

The 1998–99 Úrvalsdeild kvenna was the 41st season of the Úrvalsdeild kvenna, the top tier women's basketball league in Iceland. The season started on October 3, 1998 and ended on April 3, 1999. KR won its eleventh title by defeating Keflavík 3–0 in the Finals.

== Competition format ==
The participating teams first played a conventional round-robin schedule with every team playing each opponent twice "home" and twice "away" for a total of 20 games. The top four teams qualified for the championship playoffs whilst the bottom team was relegated to Division I.

== Regular season ==
Pos	Team	Pld	W	L	PF	PA	PD	Pts	Qualification or relegation
1	KR	20	20	0	1475	953	+522	40	Qualification to playoffs
2	ÍS	20	15	5	1256	984	+272	30	Qualification to playoffs
3	Keflavík	20	12	8	1213	1093	+120	24	Qualification to playoffs
4	Grindavík	20	6	14	1058	1194	−136	12	Qualification to playoffs
5	Njarðvík	20	6	14	1147	1417	−270	12	Asked for relegation
6	ÍR	20	3	17	1046	1325	−279	6	Relegated

Source: VÍS-deildin 1998–1999

== Playoffs ==
Semifinals
1	KR	2
4	Grindavík	0
2	ÍS	1
3	Keflavík	2

Finals
1	KR	3
3	Keflavík	0

Source: 2000 VÍS-deildin playoffs
