= 1996–97 Úrvalsdeild kvenna (basketball) =

Úrvalsdeild kvenna
- Duration: 5 October 1996 – 27 March 1997
- Teams: 7

Regular season
- Top seed: Keflavík
- Relegated: Breiðablik

Finals
- Champions: Grindavík (1st title)
- Runners-up: KR
- Semi-finalists: Keflavík, ÍS

Awards
- Domestic MVP: (Iceland) Guðbjörg Norðfjörð

Statistical leaders
Points	(United States) Penny Peppas	25.0
Rebounds	(Iceland) Guðríður Svana Bjarnadóttir	14.4
Assists	(United States) Penny Peppas	4.6

The 1996–97 Úrvalsdeild kvenna was the 40th season of the top-tier women's basketball league in Iceland. The season started on 5 October 1996 and ended on 27 March 1997. Grindavík won its 1st title after sweeping defending champions Keflavík 2–0 in the semi-finals and KR 3–0 in the Finals.

== Competition format ==
The participating teams first played a conventional round-robin schedule with every team playing each opponent twice "home" and twice "away" for a total of 18 games. The top four teams qualified for the championship playoffs while the bottom team was relegated to the second-tier Division I.

== Regular season ==
Pos	Team	Pld	W	L	PF	PA	PD	Pts	Qualification or relegation
1	Keflavík	18	18	0	1620	928	+692	36	Qualification to playoffs
2	KR	18	14	4	1317	854	+463	28	Qualification to playoffs
3	ÍS	18	11	7	1089	890	+199	22	Qualification to playoffs
4	Grindavík	18	10	8	1235	1091	+144	20	Qualification to playoffs
5	Njarðvík	18	7	11	967	1204	−237	14	Folded after the season
6	ÍR	18	2	16	738	1406	−668	4	
7	Breiðablik	18	1	17	810	1403	−593	2	Spared from relegation due to vacant berth

Source: Úrvalsdeild kvenna 1997–1998

== Playoffs ==
=== Bracket ===
Semifinals
1	Keflavík	0
4	Grindavík	2
2	KR	2
3	ÍS	0

Finals
1	KR	0
2	Grindavík	3

=== Semifinals ===
Team 1	Series	Team 2	Game 1	Game 2	Game 3
Keflavík	2–0	Grindavík	43–57	55–61	
KR	0–2	ÍS	60–36	61–50	

=== Final ===
Team 1	Series	Team 2	Game 1	Game 2	Game 3	Game 4	Game 5
KR	0–3	Grindavík	47–50	47–59	55–62		

Source: 1997 playoffs

== Awards ==
All official awards of the 1996–97 season.

=== Domestic Player of the Year ===
Pos.	Player	Team
F	(Iceland) Guðbjörg Norðfjörð	KR

=== Domestic All-First Team ===
Player	Team
(Iceland) Alda Leif Jónsdóttir	ÍS
(Iceland) Anna María Sveinsdóttir	Keflavík
(Iceland) Birna Valgarðsdóttir	Keflavík
(Iceland) Erla Reynisdóttir	Keflavík
(Iceland) Guðbjörg Norðfjörð	KR

=== Best Young Player Award ===
Player	Team
(Iceland) Þórunn Bjarnadóttir	ÍR

=== Best Coach ===
Coach	Team
(Canada) Antonio Vallejo	ÍR
