= 1994–95 Úrvalsdeild kvenna (basketball) =

Women's basketball league season in Iceland

1. deild kvenna^{1}
- Duration: 1 October 1994 – 4 April 1995
- Teams: 9

Regular season
- Top seed: Keflavík
- Relegated: None

Finals
- Champions: Breiðablik (1st title)
- Runners-up: Keflavík
- Semi-finalists: KR, Grindavík
- Finals MVP: (United States) Penny Peppas

Awards
- Domestic MVP: (Iceland) Anna María Sveinsdóttir

Statistical leaders
Points	(United States) Penny Peppas	25.7
Rebounds	(Iceland) Kristín Magnúsdóttir	11.0
Assists	(Iceland) Linda Stefánsdóttir	4.1
- ^{1} The league changed its name to Úrvalsdeild kvenna in 2007.

The 1994–95 Úrvalsdeild kvenna was the 38th season of the Úrvalsdeild kvenna, then known as 1. deild kvenna, the top tier women's basketball league in Iceland. The season started on 1 October 1994 and ended on 2 April 1995. Breiðablik won its first title by defeating Keflavík 3–0 in the Finals.

== Competition format ==
The participating teams played each opponent three times for a total of 24 games. The top four teams qualified for the championship playoffs while none were relegated to Division I due to vacance berths.

== Regular season ==
Pos	Team	Pld	W	L	PF	PA	PD	Pts	Qualification or relegation
1	Keflavík	24	21	3	1777	1158	+619	42	Qualification to playoffs
2	Breiðablik	24	20	4	1782	1306	+476	40	Qualification to playoffs
3	KR	24	16	8	1498	1190	+308	32	Qualification to playoffs
4	Grindavík	24	15	9	1341	1255	+86	30	Qualification to playoffs
5	Valur	24	12	12	1413	1282	+131	24	
6	Tindastóll	24	11	13	1408	1478	−70	22	
7	ÍS	24	8	16	1125	1367	−242	16	
8	Njarðvík	24	4	20	1129	1559	−430	8	
9	ÍR	24	1	23	992	1870	−878	2	Spared from relegation due to vacance berths

Source: 1. deild kvenna 1994–1995

== Playoffs ==
Semifinals
1	Keflavík	2
4	Grindavík	0
2	Breiðablik	2
3	KR	1

Finals
1	Keflavík	0
2	Breiðablik	3

=== Semifinals ===
Team 1	Series	Team 2	Game 1	Game 2	Game 3
Keflavík	2–0	Grindavík	76–68	63–77	
Breiðablik	2–1	KR	59–48	66–73	55–52

=== Final ===
Team 1	Series	Team 2	Game 1	Game 2	Game 3	Game 4	Game 5
Keflavík	0–3	Breiðablik	81–98	52–61	53–66		

Source: 1998 playoffs

== Awards ==
All official awards of the 1995–96 season.

=== Domestic Player of the Year ===
Pos.	Player	Team
C	(Iceland) Anna María Sveinsdóttir	Keflavík

=== Playoffs MVP ===
Pos.	Player	Team
PG	(United States) Penny Peppas	Breiðablik

=== Domestic All-First Team ===
Player	Team
(Iceland) Anna Dís Sveinbjörnsdóttir	Grindavík
(Iceland) Anna María Sveinsdóttir	Keflavík
(Iceland) Björg Hafsteinsdóttir	Keflavík
(Iceland) Helga Þorvaldsdóttir	KR
(Iceland) Linda Stefánsdóttir	Valur

=== Best Young Player Award ===
Pos.	Player	Team
G	(Iceland) Erla Reynisdóttir	Keflavík
