= 1980–81 Úrvalsdeild kvenna (basketball) =

1. deild kvenna^{1}
- Duration: 2 November 1980 – 22 February 1981
- Games played: 12
- Teams: 3

Finals
- Champions: KR (1st title)
- Runners-up: ÍS

Statistical leaders
Points	(Iceland) Linda Jónsdóttir	24.0

Records
- Highest scoring: KR 60–69 ÍS (25 January 1981)
- Winning streak: KR (3 games)
- Losing streak: ÍR (3 games)
- ^{1} The league changed its name to Úrvalsdeild kvenna in 2007.

The 1980–81 Icelandic women's national basketball tournament was the 24th season of the women's tournament in Iceland. The season started on 2 November 1980 and ended on 22 February 1981. KR won its third title in a row and fourth overall by finishing with the best record in the league. Linda Jónsdóttir finished as the top scorer with 192 points.

== Competition format ==
The participating teams played each opponent four times for a total of eight games. The team with the best record was crowned national champions.

== Regular season ==
Pos	Team	Pld	W	L	PF	PA	PD	Pts	Qualification or relegation
1	KR	8	5	3	407	378	+29	10	Champions
2	ÍS	8	4	4	362	378	−16	8	
3	ÍR	8	3	5	328	341	−13	6	

Source: 1. deild kvenna 1981

== Top scorers ==
Name	Team	Points
Linda Jónsdóttir	KR	192
Anna Eðvarðsdóttir	ÍR	126
María Guðnadóttir	KR	109
