= Hafdís Helgadóttir =

Icelandic basketball player

Personal information
- Born: 23 January 1965 (age 61) Iceland
- Listed height: 178 cm (5 ft 10 in)

Career information
- Playing career: 1985–2013
- Position: Forward
- Number: 7

Career history

Playing
- 1985-2007: ÍS
- 2007-2011: Valur
- 2013: Valur

Coaching
- 2011-2014: Valur (assistant)

Career highlights
- As player: Icelandic basketball team of the 20th century; Úrvalsdeild Domestic All-First Team 1991; Icelandic champion (1991); 2× Icelandic Basketball Cup (1991, 2003); Úrvalsdeild rebounding leader (2001); As assistant coach: Icelandic Company Cup (2013)

Career Úrvalsdeild kvenna statistics
- Points: 3,180 (8.8 ppg)
- Games: 362

Hafdís Elín Helgadóttir (born 23 January 1965) is an Icelandic former basketball player. She spent a record 25 seasons in the Úrvalsdeild kvenna, scoring 3,180 points in 362 games. She retired as the Úrvalsdeild all-time leader list in career games played but has since been surpassed by Birna Valgarðsdóttir. As a member of ÍS, she won the national championship in 1991 and the Icelandic Basketball Cup in 1991 and 2003. In 2001 she was named to the Icelandic basketball team of the 20th century.

== Playing career ==
Hafdís played her first game on 7 October 1985 with ÍS where she spent 22 seasons and played in six Basketball Cup finals, winning the cup twice. After ÍS folded in 2007, she transferred to Valur, where she last played in 2013.

== Coaching career ==
Hafdís was hired as an assistant coach to Ágúst Björgvinsson with Valur prior to the 2011-2012 Úrvalsdeild kvenna season. She won the Icelandic Company Cup with the team in 2013.

== Icelandic national team ==
Hafdís played 13 games for the Icelandic women's national basketball team between 1986 and 1993.

== Awards, titles and accomplishments ==
=== Individual awards ===
- Úrvalsdeild Domestic All-First Team : 1991

=== Titles ===
- Icelandic champion (5): 1991
- Icelandic Basketball Cup (2): 1991, 2003
- Icelandic Supercup: 1998
