= Pétur Guðmundsson (basketball) =

Icelandic basketball player (born 1958)

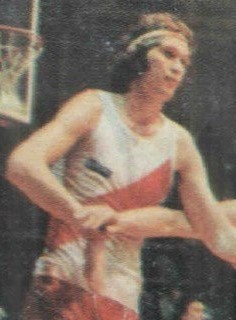
- Pétur with River Plate in 1980.

Personal information
- Born: 30 October 1958 (age 68) Reykjavík, Iceland
- Listed height: 218 cm (7 ft 2 in)
- Listed weight: 118 kg (260 lb)

Career information
- High school: Mercer Island (Mercer Island, Washington)
- College: Washington (1977–1980)
- NBA draft: 1981: 3rd round, 61st overall pick
- Drafted by: Portland Trail Blazers
- Playing career: 1980–1992
- Position: Center
- Number: 40, 34, 35
- Coaching career: 1984–2004

Career history

Playing
- 1980: Club Atlético River Plate
- 1980–1981: Valur
- 1981–1982: Portland Trail Blazers
- 1982–1983: Íþróttafélag Reykjavíkur
- 1984: Íþróttafélag Reykjavíkur
- 1984–1985: Sunderland Maestros
- 1985–1986: Tampa Bay Thrillers
- 1986: Kansas City Sizzlers
- 1986–1987: Los Angeles Lakers
- 1987–1989: San Antonio Spurs
- 1989–1990: Sioux Falls Skyforce
- 1990: New Haven Skyhawks
- 1990–1991: Tindastóll
- 1991: Sioux Falls Skyforce
- 1991–1992: Tindastóll
- 1992: Breiðablik

Coaching
- 1984: ÍR (men's)
- 2000: Valur/Fjölnir (men's)
- 2001–2002: Kongsberg Penguins
- 2002: Þór Akureyri (men's)
- 2003–2004: Grindavík (women's)

Career highlights
- As player: Icelandic Player of the 20th century; Icelandic Team of the 20th century; Úrvalsdeild Domestic Player of the year (1983); Úrvalsdeild Domestic All-First team (1992); Icelandic Basketball Cup (1981); As coach: Icelandic Women's All-Star Game head coach (2004)

Career NBA playing statistics
- Points: 693 (4.6 ppg)
- Rebounds: 563 (3.8 rpg)
- Assists: 153 (1.0 apg)
- Stats at NBA.com
- Stats at Basketball Reference

Career coaching record
- Úrvalsdeild karla: 8–6 (.571)
- Úrvalsdeild kvenna: 9–11 (.450)
- Basketligaen Norge: 12–6 (.667)

Pétur Karl Guðmundsson (born 30 October 1958) is an Icelandic former professional basketball player and coach. Standing 2.18 m (7 ft 2 in), weighing 118 kg (260 lb) and playing the center position, Pétur was the first Icelander and one of the first European players ever to play in the National Basketball Association (NBA). Often described as the greatest Icelandic basketball player of all time, he was named the Icelandic Basketball Player of the 20th century by the Icelandic Basketball Association in 2001, and in 2015, he was inducted in to the National Olympic and Sports Association of Iceland Hall of Fame. Pétur was also a member of the Icelandic national basketball team from 1978 to 1992 but missed several years of competition due to FIBA rules banning professional players from playing for national teams.

== Early life ==
Pétur (Note: Although he is properly referred to by his given name, most non-Icelandic statistical sources in basketball list him with the Anglicized name of Petur Gudmundsson, with Gudmundsson (incorrectly) treated as a surname.) was born and raised in Reykjavík to an Icelandic father and a Faroese mother. He started practicing handball at the age of 8 with Valur's junior teams but after breaking his right arm in a horse riding accident, which affected his ability to throw the ball with power, he turned to basketball at the behest of former national team player Sigurður Helgason. At the age of 12, he was 1.85 m (6 ft 1 in) tall. Due to his size and skills, he was selected to the Icelandic junior national teams where he was noticed by Marv Harshman, the head coach at the University of Washington. Harshman arranged for Pétur to move to Seattle and join Mercer Island High School at the age of 16.

== Playing career ==
=== High school career ===
Pétur attended Mercer Island High School from 1975 to 1977. He missed several games during his first year due to anemia and pneumonia and played limited minutes in several others but managed to average around 15 points per game. During his senior year, he averaged 20 points and 15 rebounds and was an All-State selection.

=== College career ===
Pétur played college basketball at the University of Washington from 1977 to 1980. His best season came in 1978–1979, when he averaged 10.1 points and 4.8 rebounds. On 8 February 1979, he scored a college career-high 37 points in a win against California. On 22 February 1979, he led the Huskies with 17 points in an upset win against top-ranked UCLA. In 81 career games for Washington, Pétur averaged 6.7 points and 5.3 rebounds per game.

=== Club career ===
==== Leaving college (1980–1981) ====
After his third college season, Pétur signed with Club Atlético River Plate in Argentina during the summer of 1980. Of his stay there, he said "In Argentina we really had no coaching; the refs were terrible; crowds were small but sometimes violent. They wouldn't even start a game down there unless the military was standing by." After the season ended in Argentina in November, Pétur briefly joined KR and played with the team in an unofficial continental tournament in England. Despite KR's heavy interest in signing him for the rest of the Úrvalsdeild karla season, Pétur signed with Valur at the end of December 1980. On 5 March 1981, he helped Valur win the Icelandic Cup after scoring a team high 20 points in a 90–84 victory against Njarðvík in the Cup finals. In 7 Úrvalsdeild games for Valur, Pétur averaged 16.7 points per game.

==== Drafted to the NBA (1981–1982) ====
Pétur was selected in the third round of the 1981 NBA draft by the Portland Trail Blazers, for whom he played during the 1981–82 season. On 19 March 1982, he scored a season high 18 points and grabbed 11 rebounds in a victory against the Utah Jazz. In 68 games for the Trail Blazers, he averaged 3.2 points and 2.7 rebounds. He returned to the Blazers ahead of the 1982–83 season but did not make the 12-man roster following the preseason.

==== Back in Iceland (1982–1984) ====
After initially reaching an agreement to play in Italy for Fabriano Basket as an injury replacement for their American player, Pétur returned to Iceland and joined Íþróttafélag Reykjavíkur in November 1982 after the injured player recovered quicker than expected. Prior to his arrival, ÍR was last in the league, having lost all 6 games. With Pétur, the team won 9 of its last 14 games, finishing third in the league, and made it to the Cup finals where it lost to Valur, 75–78, despite Pétur's game high 27 points. In 14 Úrvalsdeild games, Pétur averaged 28.0 points per game.

In August 1983, the Blazers traded his rights to the Detroit Pistons in exchange for a 1984 third-round draft pick. He was waived by the Pistons on 25 October 1983, prior to the start of the season.

In January 1984, Pétur returned to ÍR as a player-coach. At the time of his arrival, ÍR was dead last in the Úrvalsdeild with only two victories in its first 11 games. Behind stellar play of Pétur, who averaged 26.6 points per game, the team won seven of its remaining nine games, but missed the playoffs on a tiebreaker.

==== Season in England (1984–1985) ====
In October 1984, Pétur signed with the Sunderland Maestros for the 1984–85 National Basketball League season. On 12 November 1984, he scored 44 points and grabbed 16 rebounds in an 89–76 victory against Liverpool. Sunderland finished the season in 9th place but missed the playoffs on a tiebreaker.

==== Back to the USA and second NBA stint (1985–1990) ====
In September 1985, Pétur signed with the Tampa Bay Thrillers of the Continental Basketball Association.

In 1986, Pétur was set to play for the CBA's Kansas City Sizzlers but was denied a work permit by the U.S. Immigration and Naturalization Service.

On 19 March 1986, Pétur signed a 10-day contract with the Los Angeles Lakers as a free agent. In his first game, he posted 14 points in 20 minutes in a victory against the San Antonio Spurs. After 10 days, he received another 10-day contract, and then was signed for the rest of the season. In 8 regular season games, he averaged 7.3 points and 4.8 rebounds.

In the summer of 1986, Pétur signed a 2-year contract extension with the Lakers. Prior to the season, during training camp, he suffered a back injury that was later diagnosed as a slipped disc and eventually required surgery. While recovering, he was traded to the San Antonio Spurs along with Frank Brickowski, two draft picks and an undisclosed amount of money in exchange for Mychal Thompson on 13 February 1987. He appeared in a career high 69 games, including 9 starts, during the 1987–88 season. On 28 November 1987, Pétur scored an NBA career high 21 points against the Atlanta Hawks. After being one of eight Spurs players protected in the 1988 NBA expansion draft, Pétur started the first game of the 1988–89 season, a 122–107 victory against his former team Lakers, where he scored 7 points in 21 minutes. He was again in the starting lineup during the second game of the season but suffered a knee injury in the fourth quarter that required surgery. He returned to the court a month later, but struggled as the knee had not fully healed. The injury eventually forced him to miss the rest of the season.

During the summer of 1989, Pétur joined the Lakers' summer league team but suffered an Achilles injury in practice before the season started. Later tests revealed a partial tear in his Achilles tendon. In October 1989, he signed a training camp contract with the Minnesota Timberwolves. He was waived before the season's start.

Pétur played with the Sioux Falls Skyforce from January to March 1990, where he averaged 5.8 points and 6.0 rebounds per game in 22 appearances.

==== Return to the Úrvalsdeild and final stint in the USA (1990–1992) ====
In October 1990, Pétur returned to the Úrvalsdeild karla for the first time in six years and signed with Tindastóll for a reported 2.3 million ISK salary for the season. Tindastóll had a strong start, winning 12 of its first 14 games. In January, Pétur suffered an Achilles sprain and missed 7 games, 6 of which were losses. Due to Pétur's injury, Tindastóll's play faded in the second half of the season and the team lost 9 of its last 12 games, ending with a 15–11 record and finishing fifth, two victories out of the playoffs. For the season, Pétur averaged 19.5 points and 12.7 rebounds while shooting 69.4% from the field.

In August 1991, Pétur signed a training camp contract with the Philadelphia 76ers. He was waived in October 1991, prior to the start of the season. The same month, he again signed with the Sioux Falls Skyforce. In 4 games for the Skyforce, Pétur averaged 2.8 points and 2.2 rebounds per game.

On 20 November, Pétur left the Skyforce and signed back with Tindastóll. Tindastóll had started the season poorly, with two victories in their first six games. After losing three of their first four games with Pétur, the team bounced back with three wins in a row. After a loss against KR on 5 January 1992, Tindastóll went on an 11-win run before losing to Skallagrímur in the last game of the season. The loss, along with a KR win on the same day, meant that Tindastóll missed out on the playoffs again. In 20 games for Tindastóll, Pétur averaged 20.0 points and 13.7 rebounds per game.

==== Final season and retirement (1992–1993) ====
After contemplating retirement due to a back injury, Pétur signed with a recently promoted Breiðablik in August 1992. In December 1992, with Breiðablik in last place, Pétur left the team for personal reasons. In 13 games, Pétur averaged 20.3 points, 14.5 rebounds, 3.1 assists and 1.8 steals per game. In January 1993, Pétur announced that he intended to join Valur for the rest of the season and end his career where it started. His transfer request was rejected by the Icelandic Basketball Association, as transfers between Icelandic teams between 16 December and 15 February were only allowed under special circumstances.

== National team career ==
In his youth, Pétur played 24 games for the Iceland junior national teams. Between 1978 and 1992, he played 53 games for the Icelandic senior national team. Due to FIBA rules banning professional players from playing for national teams, he was unable to play with the Icelandic national team for several years until the ban was lifted in 1989.

== Coaching career ==
After failing to receive a playing contract in the United States, Pétur signed as a player-coach for ÍR in January 1984. At the time of his arrival, ÍR was dead last in the Úrvalsdeild with only two victories in the first 11 games. With Pétur at the helm, the team won seven of its remaining nine games but missed the playoffs on a tiebreaker.

In June 1993, Pétur was hired as the head coach of Valur, where he also intended to play. In August 1993, prior to the start of the season, he resigned from his post for personal reasons and moved to the United States. Pétur returned to Valur in June 2000 and signed a three-year contract to coach the joint team of Valur/Fjölnir in the Úrvalsdeild karla. He was fired at the end of October 2000, after four losses in the first five games.

The following, Pétur was hired as the head coach of the Kongsberg Penguins ahead of the 2001–2002 BLNO season. He led the team to 12 wins in 18 games during the regular season. In the playoffs, the Penguins reached the BLNO finals after defeating the Oslo Kings in the semi-finals 3–2. In the finals, the Penguins lost to the Asker Aliens, 3–0. He left the team after the season following a disagreement with the board.

On 4 September 2002, Pétur was hired as the head coach and general manager of Þór Akureyri. On 17 September, he resigned due to the team's poor financial situation. A week later, Þór withdrew its team from the Úrvalsdeild.

During the 2003–2004 season, Pétur coached Grindavík in the Úrvalsdeild kvenna. After a poor start, the team finished strong and made the playoffs, where it was knocked out in the semi-finals by eventual champions Keflavík. In January 2004, he was selected as the head coach of Team Suðurnes in the Icelandic Women's All-Star Game. His team won the game against Team Reykjavík 99–78. He was released from his contract with Grindavík at his own request following the season.

=== Coaching record ===
Season	Team	Wins	Losses	%	Playoffs	Notes
1983–84	ÍR	7	2	78%	DNQ	Hired in January '84
2000–01	Valur/Fjölnir	1	4	20%	N/A	Fired in November '00
2001–02	Kongsberg Penguins	12	6	67%	Finals	
2003–04	Grindavík	9	11	45%	Semi-finals	

== Career statistics ==
=== NBA ===
Legend
GP	Games played	GS	Games started	MPG	Minutes per game
FG%	Field goal percentage	3P%	3-point field goal percentage	FT%	Free throw percentage
RPG	Rebounds per game	APG	Assists per game	SPG	Steals per game
BPG	Blocks per game	PPG	Points per game	**Bold**	Career high

==== Regular season ====
Year	Team	GP	GS	MPG	FG%	3P%	FT%	RPG	APG	SPG	BPG	PPG
1981–82	Portland	68	6	12.4	.500	**1.000**	.684	2.7	.9	.2	.4	3.2
1985–86	L.A. Lakers	8	2	**16.0**	**.541**	–	.667	**4.8**	.4	**.4**	.5	**7.3**
1987–88	San Antonio	**69**	**9**	14.7	.496	.000	**.807**	4.7	**1.2**	.3	**.9**	5.7
1988–89	San Antonio	5	3	14.0	.360	–	.750	3.2	1.0	.2	.2	4.2
Career		150	20	13.7	.494	.500	.754	3.8	1.0	.2	.6	4.6

==== Playoffs ====
Year	Team	GP	GS	MPG	FG%	3P%	FT%	RPG	APG	SPG	BPG	PPG
1986	L.A. Lakers	**12**	0	**9.3**	**.593**	.000	**.667**	**2.2**	.3	**.3**	**.3**	**3.5**
1988	San Antonio	2	0	3.0	.000	–	–	.0	**.5**	.0	.0	.0
Career		14	0	8.4	.552	.000	.667	1.9	.3	.2	.3	3.0

=== Úrvalsdeild karla ===
Legend
GP	Games played	GS	Games started	MPG	Minutes per game
FG%	Field goal percentage	3P%	3-point field goal percentage	FT%	Free throw percentage
RPG	Rebounds per game	APG	Assists per game	SPG	Steals per game
BPG	Blocks per game	PPG	Points per game	**Bold**	Career high

==== Regular season ====
Year	Team	GP	GS	MPG	FG%	3P%	FT%	RPG	APG	SPG	BPG	PPG
1980–81	Valur	7	-	-	-	-	.636	-	-	-	-	16.7
1982–83	ÍR	14	-	-	-	-	.720	-	-	-	-	**28.0**
1983–84	ÍR	9	-	-	-	-	.750	-	-	-	-	26.6
1990–91	Tindastóll	19	-	-	**.692**	**1.000**	.701	12.7	1.4	.5	-	19.5
1991–92	Tindastóll	**20**	-	-	.678	.500	**.805**	13.7	2.5	1.1	-	20.0
1992–93	Breiðablik	13	-	-	.615	**1.000**	.651	**14.5**	**3.1**	**1.6**	-	20.3
Career		82	-	-	-	-	.725	-	-	-	-	21.7

== Awards and accomplishments ==
=== Team of the 20th century ===
In 2001 Pétur was voted the Icelandic basketball Player of the Century and as one of the twelve players on the Icelandic Team of the 20th Century.

=== Club honours ===
- Icelandic Basketball Cup (1): 1981

=== Individual awards ===
- Icelandic Player of the 20th Century
- Icelandic Team of the 20th Century
- National Olympic and Sports Association of Iceland Hall of Fame: 2015
- Úrvalsdeild Domestic Player of the Year (1): 1983
- Úrvalsdeild Domestic All-First Team (1): 1992
