= 1995–96 Úrvalsdeild kvenna (basketball) =

Úrvalsdeild kvenna
- Duration: 6 October 1995 – 13 March 1996
- Teams: 10

Regular season
- Top seed: Keflavík
- Relegated: ÍA

Finals
- Champions: Keflavík (13th title)
- Runners-up: KR
- Semi-finalists: Breiðablik, Grindavík

Awards
- Domestic MVP: (Iceland) Anna María Sveinsdóttir
- Foreign MVP: (United States) Betsy Harris

Statistical leaders
| Points | (United States) Penny Peppas | 28.9 |
| Rebounds | (Iceland) Sóley Sigurþórsdóttir | 10.6 |
| Assists | (Iceland) Linda Stefánsdóttir | 5.2 |

The 1995–96 Úrvalsdeild kvenna was the 39th season of the top-tier women's basketball league in Iceland. The season started on 6 October 1995 and ended on 13 March 1996. Keflavík won its 7th title by defeating KR 3–1 in the Finals.

== Competition format ==
The participating teams first played a conventional round-robin schedule with every team playing each opponent once "home" and once "away" for a total of 18 games. The top four teams qualified for the championship playoffs while the bottom team was relegated to the second-tier Division I.

== Regular season ==
| Pos | Team | Pld | W | L | PF | PA | PD | Pts | Qualification or relegation |
|---|---|---|---|---|---|---|---|---|---|
| 1 | Keflavík | 18 | 16 | 2 | 1470 | 947 | +523 | 32 | Qualification to playoffs |
| 2 | Grindavík | 18 | 14 | 4 | 1281 | 1007 | +274 | 28 | Qualification to playoffs |
| 3 | KR | 18 | 14 | 4 | 1237 | 982 | +255 | 28 | Qualification to playoffs |
| 4 | Breiðablik | 18 | 14 | 4 | 1357 | 995 | +362 | 28 | Qualification to playoffs |
| 5 | ÍR | 18 | 9 | 9 | 1218 | 1174 | +44 | 18 | |
| 6 | Njarðvík | 18 | 9 | 9 | 1108 | 1089 | +19 | 18 | |
| 7 | Tindastóll | 18 | 6 | 12 | 1088 | 1264 | −176 | 12 | |
| 8 | Valur | 18 | 5 | 13 | 944 | 1200 | −256 | 10 | |
| 9 | ÍS | 18 | 2 | 16 | 798 | 1295 | −497 | 4 | |
| 10 | ÍA | 18 | 1 | 17 | 808 | 1356 | −548 | 2 | Relegated |

Source: Úrvalsdeild kvenna 1995–1996

== Playoffs ==
=== Bracket ===
Semifinals
1 | Keflavík | 2
4 | Breiðablik | 0
2 | KR | 2
3 | Grindavík | 0

Finals
1 | Keflavík | 3
2 | KR | 1

=== Semifinals ===
| Team 1 | Series | Team 2 | Game 1 | Game 2 | Game 3 |
|---|---|---|---|---|---|
| Keflavík | 2–0 | Breiðablik | 84–67 | 53–46 | |
| Grindavík | 0–2 | KR | 77–63 | 55–49 | |

=== Final ===
| Team 1 | Series | Team 2 | Game 1 | Game 2 | Game 3 | Game 4 | Game 5 |
|---|---|---|---|---|---|---|---|
| Keflavík | 3–1 | KR | 70–58 | 63–60 | 56–55 | 70–37 | |

Source: 1996 playoffs

== Awards ==
All official awards of the 1995–96 season.

=== Domestic Player of the Year ===
| Pos. | Player | Team |
|---|---|---|
| C | (Iceland) Anna María Sveinsdóttir | Keflavík |

=== Foreign Player of the Year ===
| Pos. | Player | Team |
|---|---|---|
| G | (United States) Betsy Harris | Breiðablik |

=== Domestic All-First Team ===
| Player | Team |
|---|---|
| (Iceland) Anna Dís Sveinbjörnsdóttir | ÍR |
| (Iceland) Anna María Sveinsdóttir | Keflavík |
| (Iceland) Guðbjörg Norðfjörð | KR |
| (Iceland) Helga Þorvaldsdóttir | KR |
| (Iceland) Linda Stefánsdóttir | ÍR |

=== Best Young Player Award ===
| Pos. | Player | Team |
|---|---|---|
| C | (Iceland) Sóley Sigurþórsdóttir | ÍA |

=== Best Coach ===
| Coach | Team |
|---|---|
| (United States) Suzette Sargeant | Njarðvík |
