= Penni Peppas =

American basketball player

Personal information
- Born: July 2, 1972 (age 54)

Career information
- College: University of the Ozarks
- Playing career: 1994–1998
- Position: Point guard

Career history
- 1994–1995: Breiðablik
- 1995–1998: Grindavík

Career highlights
- Úrvalsdeild Playoffs MVP (1995); 2× Icelandic champion (1995, 1997); Icelandic Basketball Super Cup (1997); 3× Úrvalsdeild scoring champion (1995-1997); Úrvalsdeild assists leader (1997)

Career Úrvalsdeild kvenna statistics
- Points: 1,723 (23.9 ppg)
- Rebounds: 599 (8.3 rpg)
- Assists: 276 (3.8 apg)

Penni Ann Peppas (born July 2, 1972) is an American former basketball player. Following a college career at the University of the Ozarks, she became the first foreign born professional women's basketball player in Iceland, where she won multiple national championships and scoring titles.

== College ==
Peppas played for University of the Ozarks from 1990 to 1994 and left as the schools allt time leader in total points (2,170).

== Iceland ==
After graduating in 1994, Peppas signed with Breiðablik in Iceland, becoming the first foreign born professional player in the Icelandic Úrvalsdeild kvenna. She was a three time scoring champion in the Úrvalsdeild and led the league in assists in 1997. Peppas won the Icelandic championship twice, in 1995 with Breiðablik, while also being named as Playoffs MVP, and in 1997 with Grindavík. On October 15, 1996, Peppas had a Quadruple-double against ÍR. For the game she had 52 points, 16 rebounds, 11 assists and 10 rebounds.

== Honours ==
- Úrvalsdeild Playoffs MVP (1995)
- 2x Icelandic champion (1995, 1997)
- Icelandic Basketball Supercup (1997)
- 3x Úrvalsdeild scoring champion (1995–1997)
- Úrvalsdeild assists leader (1997)
- University of the Ozarks Sports Hall of Fame (2002)
- NAIA All-America (1991–92, 1992–93, 1993–94)
- Kodak All-American (1992–93)

== Úrvalsdeild statistics ==
†	Denotes seasons in which Peppas won the national championship
*	Led the league

=== Regular season statistics ===
Year	Team	GP	2P%	3P%	FT%	RPG	APG	SPG	BPG	PPG
1994–95†	Breiðablik	23	.550	.309	.824	8.7	3.5	4.5	0.9	25.7*
1995–96	Grindavík	18	.606	.304	.807	8.6	3.4	4.4	0.8	28.9*
1996–97†	Grindavík	17	.571	.297	.775*	9.3	4.6*	4.7	0.6	25.0*
1997–98	Grindavík	14	.420	.286	.900*	6.2	3.9	2.9	0.8	13.4
Career		72	.556	.294	.814	8.3	3.8	4.2	0.8	23.9

=== Playoffs statistics ===
Year	Team	GP	2P%	3P%	FT%	RPG	APG	SPG	BPG	PPG
1995†	Breiðablik	6	.512	.393	.793	9.7	3.5	3.5	1.7	23.7
1996	Grindavík	2	.605	.000	.818	7.5	1.5	6.0	1.5	27.5
1997†	Grindavík	5	.544	.398	.840	8.8	3.2	2.5	1.4	20.8
1998	Grindavík	2	.455	.222	.900	5.5	3.0	2.0	0.5	17.5
Career		15	.532	.323	.823	8.5	3.0	3.3	1.4	22.4
