= Þóranna Kika Hodge-Carr =

Icelandic basketball player

Valur
- Position: Guard
- League: Úrvalsdeild kvenna

Personal information
- Born: 18 July 1999 (age 27)
- Listed height: 173 cm (5 ft 8 in)

Career information
- College: Iona (2020–2023); Loyola Chicago (2023–2025)
- Playing career: 2015–present

Career history
- 2015–2020: Keflavík
- 2025–present: Valur

Career highlights
- Icelandic championship (2017); 2× Icelandic Basketball Cup (2017, 2018); 2× Icelandic Super Cup (2017, 2018)

Þóranna Kika Hodge-Carr (born 18 July 1999) is an Icelandic basketball player for Valur and the Icelandic national team. She started her career with Keflavík in the Icelandic Úrvalsdeild kvenna where she won the national championship in 2017.

== Playing career ==
=== First seasons and championship (2015–2020) ===
After coming up through Keflavík junior teams, Þóranna played her first games in the top-tier Úrvalsdeild kvenna during the 2015–2016 season. She helped Keflavík to the national championship in 2017 when they beat three-time defending champions Snæfell in the Úrvalsdeild finals. The next season, she tore an anterior cruciate ligament in her knee. She bounced back the following season and averaged 9.4 points and 5.4 rebounds for Keflavík before the rest of the season and playoffs where canceled in March 2020 due to the coronavirus pandemic in Iceland.

=== College career (2020–2025) ===
In May 2020, Þóranna agreed to join the Iona College for the 2020–2021 season.

=== Valur ===
In June 2025, she signed with Valur.

== National team career ==
Þóranna started playing with Iceland's junior national teams in 2014. In 2015, she was named to the U-16 Nordic Championships All-first team. debuted with the Icelandic national team in 2019.
