= Eðvaldsson =

Eðvaldsson is an Icelandic surname. Notable people with the surname include:

- Atli Eðvaldsson (1957–2019), Icelandic footballer
- Jóhannes Eðvaldsson (born 1950), Icelandic footballer
- Jón Halldór Eðvaldsson
