= 1997–98 Úrvalsdeild kvenna (basketball) =

Úrvalsdeild kvenna
- Duration: 4 October 1997 – 28 March 1998
- Teams: 5

Regular season
- Top seed: Keflavík

Finals
- Champions: Keflavík (14th title)
- Runners-up: KR
- Semi-finalists: Grindavík, ÍS

Awards
- Domestic MVP: (Iceland) Anna María Sveinsdóttir
- Foreign MVP: (United States) Jennifer Boucek

Statistical leaders
Points	(United States) Anna María Sveinsdóttir	15.1
Rebounds	(Iceland) Signý Hermannsdóttir	9.2
Assists	(Iceland) Alda Leif Jónsdóttir	5.1

The 1997–98 Úrvalsdeild kvenna was the 41st season of the top-tier women's basketball league in Iceland. The season started on 4 October 1997 and ended on 28 March 1998. Keflavík won its 14th title after defeating KR 3–1 in the Finals.

== Competition format ==
The participating teams first played a conventional round-robin schedule with every team playing each opponent twice "home" and twice "away" for a total of 16 games. The top four teams qualified for the championship playoffs while none was relegated to the second-tier Division I due to vacant berth.

== Regular season ==
Six teams started the season, down from seven the previous season. In end of October 1997, Breiðablik withdrew its team from the league after suffering loopside losses in their four games.

Pos	Team	Pld	W	L	PF	PA	PD	Pts	Qualification or relegation
1	Keflavík	16	13	3	1156	855	+301	26	Qualification to playoffs
2	KR	16	13	3	1065	855	+210	26	Qualification to playoffs
3	Grindavík	16	8	8	948	920	+28	16	Qualification to playoffs
4	ÍS	16	6	10	903	955	−52	12	Qualification to playoffs
5	ÍR	16	0	16	726	1213	−487	0	

Source: Úrvalsdeild kvenna 1997–1998

== Playoffs ==
=== Bracket ===
Semifinals
1	Keflavík	2
4	ÍS	0
2	KR	2
3	Grindavík	0

Finals
1	Grindavík	3
2	KR	1

=== Semifinals ===
Team 1	Series	Team 2	Game 1	Game 2	Game 3
Keflavík	2–0	ÍS	71–57	91–59	
KR	2–0	Grindavík	53–39	66–51	

=== Final ===
Team 1	Series	Team 2	Game 1	Game 2	Game 3	Game 4	Game 5
Keflavík	3–1	KR	75–54	65–75	71–61	61–50	

Source: 1998 playoffs

== Awards ==
All official awards of the 1997–98 season.

=== Domestic Player of the Year ===
Pos.	Player	Team
C	(Iceland) Anna María Sveinsdóttir	Keflavík

=== Foreign Player of the Year ===
Pos.	Player	Team
G	(United States) Jennifer Boucek	Keflavík

=== Domestic All-First Team ===
Player	Team
(Iceland) Alda Leif Jónsdóttir	ÍS
(Iceland) Anna María Sveinsdóttir	Keflavík
(Iceland) Erla Reynisdóttir	Keflavík
(Iceland) Erla Þorsteinsdóttir	Keflavík
(Iceland) Guðbjörg Norðfjörð	KR

=== Best Young Player Award ===
Player	Team
(Iceland) Guðrún A. Sigurðardóttir	ÍR

=== Best Coach ===
Coach	Team
(Iceland) Karl Jónsson	ÍR

== Notable ==
- On 26 October, the board of Breiðablik withdrew the team from the league after starting the season with 4 losses, including a 124–24 loss against Keflavík on 25. October.
