= Jana Falsdóttir =

Icelandic basketball player

Cal State Fullerton
- Position: Point guard
- League: Big West Conference

Personal information
- Born: 29 November 2005 (age 20)
- Listed height: 165 cm (5 ft 5 in)

Career information
- College: Cal State Fullerton (2024–present)
- Playing career: 2020–present

Career history
- 2020–2021: Stjarnan
- 2021–2023: Haukar
- 2023–2024: Njarðvík

Career highlights
- 2× Icelandic Basketball Cup (2022, 2023); Icelandic Super Cup (2021)

Jana Falsdóttir (29 November 2005) is an Icelandic basketball player who plays for California State University, Fullerton, and for the Iceland national team.

== Playing career ==
Jana played junior basketball with Keflavík. She started her senior team career with Stjarnan in 2020 and went on to average 16.5 points, 5.7 rebounds and 3.3 assists.

After one season with Stjarnan, she moved to Haukar in August 2021. On 24 September 2021, at the age of 15, she became the youngest Icelandic player to play and score in a continental competition when she scored in a win against Clube União Sportiva in the 2021–22 EuroCup Women qualifiers, breaking the records of Unnur Tara Jónsdóttir and Ragna Margrét Brynjarsdóttir. During her two seasons with Haukar, she won the Icelandic Basketball Cup twice.

In 2023, she signed with Njarðvík.

In 2024, she joined California State University, Fullerton.

== National team career ==
Jana has played for the Icelandic junior national teams. During the 2021 Nordic U-16 Championships, she registered 10 steals along with a team high 16 points in a win against Denmark U-16.

She debuted with the Iceland national team in November 2023 against Turkey.

== Personal life ==
Jana is the daughter of former basketball players Margrét Sturlaugsdóttir and Falur Harðarson.
