= Hanna Björg Kjartansdóttir =

Icelandic basketball player

- Born: 30 September 1974 (age 52); Reykjavík, Iceland
- Height: 1.80 m (5 ft 11 in)
- Basketball career

Career information
- College: Trevecca Nazarene (1996–1997)
- Playing career: 1990–2009

Career history
- 1990–1992: Haukar
- 1992–1994: Keflavík
- 1994–1996: Breiðablik
- 1997–2001: KR
- 2001–2002: BK Skjold/Stevnsgade
- 2002–2003: KR
- 2004–2005: KR
- 2005–2006: ÍS
- 2007–2008: Valur
- 2008: KR-b
- 2009: Valur

Career highlights
- Icelandic basketball team of the 20th century; Úrvalsdeild Domestic Player of the Year (1992); 4x Úrvalsdeild Domestic All-First Team (1992, 1999–2001); 5x Icelandic champion (1993–1995, 1999, 2001); 6× Icelandic Basketball Cup (1992–1994, 1999, 2001, 2006); 2× Icelandic Supercup (1995, 1999); Icelandic Company Cup (2000); Danish Basketball Cup (2002)
Association football career
Senior career*
| Years | Team | Apps | (Gls) |
| 19??–1993 | Haukar | - | (-) |
| 1994–1996 | Stjarnan | 32 | (1) |
| 1997 | Reynir Sandgerði | - | (-) |
| 1999 | Fjölnir | 6 | (0) |
| 2000–2001 | RKV | 15 | (0) |
International career^{‡}
| 1991 | Iceland U-16 | 2 | (0) |
| 1994 | Iceland U-21 | 3 | (0) |
- * Club domestic league appearances and goals as of 21 June 2020 (UTC) ‡ National team caps and goals as of 21 June 2020 (UTC)

Hanna Björg Kjartansdóttir (born 30 September 1974) is an Icelandic former multi-sport athlete, competing in the Icelandic top-tier leagues in basketball and football. She won several Icelandic championships in basketball and was a member of the Icelandic national basketball team. In 2001, she was named to the Icelandic basketball team of the 20th century.

== Achievement ==
=== Awards ===
- Icelandic basketball team of the 20th century
- Úrvalsdeild Domestic Player of the Year (1992)
- 4x Úrvalsdeild Domestic All-First Team (1992, 1999, 2000, 2001)

=== Titles ===
- 5x Icelandic champion (1993, 1994, 1995, 1999, 2001)
- 6× Icelandic Basketball Cup (1992, 1993, 1994, 1999, 2001, 2006)
- 2× Icelandic Supercup (1995, 1999)
- Icelandic Company Cup (2000)
- Danish Basketball Cup (2002)
