= Pálína Gunnlaugsdóttir =

Icelandic basketball player

Pálína María Gunnlaugsdóttir
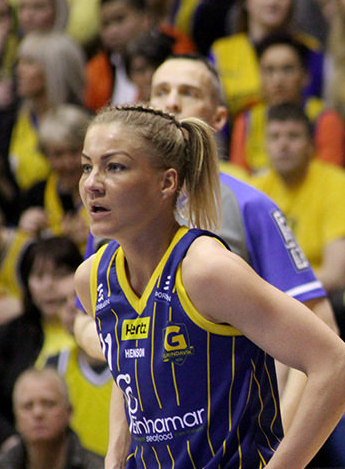
- Pálína with Grindavík in February 2015.

Personal information
- Born: 2 January 1987 (age 39) Iceland
- Listed height: 167 cm (5 ft 6 in)

Career information
- Playing career: 2000–2016
- Position: Shooting guard
- Coaching career: 2019–present

Career history

Playing
- 2000–2007: Haukar
- 2007–2013: Keflavík
- 2013–2015: Grindavík
- 2015–2016: Haukar
- 2016: Snæfell

Coaching
- 2019: Iceland (assistant)
- 2021: Stjarnan

Career highlights
- 3x Úrvalsdeild Domestic Player of the Year (2008, 2012, 2013); 2× Úrvalsdeild Playoffs MVP (2011, 2013); 6× Úrvalsdeild Defensive Player of the Year (2005-2008, 2012, 2013); 4× Úrvalsdeild Domestic All-First Team (2008, 2011-2013); 5× Icelandic league champion (2006, 2007, 2008, 2011, 2013); 5× Icelandic Basketball Cup (2005, 2007, 2011, 2013, 2015); 4× Icelandic Supercup (2006, 2007, 2008, 2016)
Medals
Women's basketball
Representing Iceland
Games of the Small States of Europe
Silver medal – second place	2009 Andorra	National Team
Silver medal – second place	2013 Luxembourg	National Team
Silver medal – second place	2015 Iceland	National Team

Pálína María Gunnlaugsdóttir (born 2 January 1987) is an Icelandic sport TV host, basketball coach and a former player. She is currently a host for Stöð 2 Sport's Domino's Körfuboltakvöld (English: Domino's Basketball Night). During her career she won the Icelandic championship five times and was named the playoffs MVP in 2011 and 2013. Pálína was named the Úrvalsdeild Domestic Player of the Year three-times, in 2008, 2012 and 2013.

== Playing career ==
Pálína started her senior team career with Haukar during the 2000–2001 season. After helping Haukar wing back-to-back national championships in 2006 and 2007, she signed with Keflavík. In her five seasons with Keflavík, Pálína won the national championship three times; in 2008, 2011 and 2013. In 2013, she signed with Grindavík After two seasons with Grindavík, where she won the Icelandic Cup in 2015, she returned to Haukar and helped the team to the 2016 Úrvalsdeild Finals. The following season she signed with Snæfell but left the team in January 2017 for personal reasons.

== Icelandic national team ==
Between 2006 and 2016, Pálína played 36 games for the Icelandic national basketball team.

== Coaching career ==
In 2019, Pálina was hired as an assistant coach to the Icelandic women's national basketball team.

In April 2021, she replaced Margrét Sturlaugsdóttir as head coach of Stjarnan women's team.

== Awards and honors ==
=== Awards ===
- 3x Úrvalsdeild Domestic Player of the Year (2008, 2012, 2013)
- 2x Úrvalsdeild Playoffs MVP (2011, 2013)
- 6x Úrvalsdeild Defensive Player of the Year (2005–2008, 2012, 2013)
- 4x Úrvalsdeild Domestic All-First Team (2008, 2011–2013)
- 1x Icelandic Cup Finals MVP (2011)

=== Titles ===
- 5x Icelandic champion (2006, 2007, 2008, 2011, 2013)
- 5× Icelandic Basketball Cup (2005, 2007, 2011, 2013, 2015)
- 4x Icelandic Supercup (2006, 2007, 2008, 2016)
- 6x Icelandic Company Cup (2005, 2006, 2007, 2008, 2010, 2015)
- 2x Icelandic Division I (2002, 2004)
