= Ingibjörg Jakobsdóttir =

Icelandic basketball player

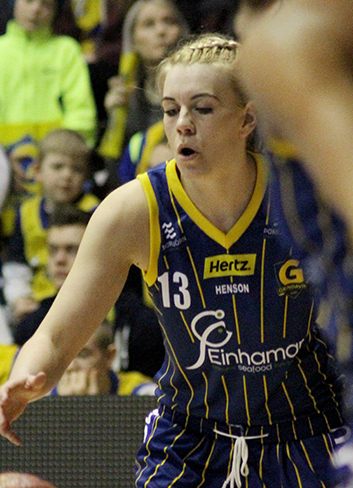
- Ingibjörg in 2015.

Personal information
- Born: 12 June 1990 (age 36) Iceland
- Listed height: 173 cm (5 ft 8 in)

Career information
- Playing career: 2005–2020
- Position: Point guard
- Number: 13

Career history
- 2005–2010: Grindavík
- 2010–2012: Keflavík
- 2012–2013: Aabyhøj
- 2013: Keflavík
- 2013–2020: Grindavík

Career highlights
- 2× Icelandic champion (2011, 2013); 3× Icelandic Cup (2008, 2011, 2015); Icelandic Company Cup (2010); 5× Icelandic All-Star (2007–2009, 2011, 2014)
Medals
Women's basketball
Representing Iceland
Games of the Small States of Europe
Silver medal – second place	2009 Cyprus	Team

Ingibjörg Jakobsdóttir (born 12 June 1990) is an Icelandic former basketball player and a former member of the Icelandic national basketball team. She won the Icelandic championship in 2011 and 2013 as a member of Keflavík and has won the Icelandic Basketball Cup three times, in 2008, 2011 and 2015.

== Playing career ==
After being part of Grindavík's successful junior programs, where her group won several junior Icelandic championships, she played her first games with the senior team during the 2005-2006 Úrvalsdeild season. She won her first major trophy on 24 February 2008 when Grindavík defeated Haukar, 77–67, in the Icelandic Cup finals.

On 25 November 2009, she tore her anterior cruciate ligament in a game against Haukar in the Úrvalsdeild and missed the rest of the season. After recovering, she joined Keflavík prior to the 2010–2011 season and helped the club win both the national championship and the Icelandic Cup, where she was a key player down the stretch in Keflavík's 62–72 victory.

On 21 September 2011, she again tore her anterior cruciate ligament, this time four minutes into Keflavík's first game of the Company Cup, and missed the rest of the season. In August 2012, Ingibjörg signed with Aabyhoj in Denmark. She returned to Keflavík in February 2013 and finished the season with the club. She won her second national championship with Keflavík on 29 April 2013. After the season, she left Keflavík and signed with Grindavík.

Ingibjörg helped Grindavík win the Icelandic cup in 2015 despite suffering an early injury during the game. During the 2016–2017 season, she again had problems with injury, missing several games because of broken ribs. With several other key players missing games due to injuries, Grindavík's season ended in a disappointment as the team was relegated to 1. deild kvenna. Ingibjörg missed the 2017–2018 season due to pregnancy but returned to the team in September 2018. In April 2019, she helped Grindavík defeat 1. deild kvenna champions Fjölnir, 3–0, in the promotion playoffs for a seat in the Úrvalsdeild.

== National team career ==
Ingibjörg played 16 games for the Icelandic national basketball team from 2007 to 2016. She was part of Iceland's team that finished second on the 2009 Games of the Small States of Europe.
