= Valur Ingimundarson =

Icelandic basketball player and coach

Personal information
- Born: 20 February 1962 (age 64)

Career information
- Playing career: 1979–2004
- Position: Small forward
- Number: 15
- Coaching career: 1985–2012

Career history

Playing
- 1979–1988: Njarðvík
- 1988–1993: Tindastóll
- 1993–1995: Njarðvík
- 1995–1998: BK Odense
- 1998–2002: Tindastóll
- 2002–2004: Skallagrímur

Coaching
- 1985–1986: Njarðvík (Women's)
- 1986–1988: Njarðvík (Men's)
- 1988–1990: Tindastóll (Men's)
- 1991–1993: Tindastóll (Men's)
- 1993–1995: Njarðvík (Men's)
- 1994–1995: Njarðvík (Women's)
- 1995–1998: BK Odense (Men's)
- 1998–2002: Tindastóll (Men's)
- 2002–2007: Skallagrímur (Men's)
- 2008–2009: Njarðvík (Men's)
- 2010–2011: FSu (Men's)
- 2011–2012: Ammerud Basket (Men's)
- 2011–2012: Ammerud Basket (Women's)

Career highlights
- As player: 2x Icelandic Basketball Player of the Year (1984, 1988); 3x Úrvalsdeild Domestic Player of the year (1984, 1985, 1988); 5x Úrvalsdeild Domestic All-First team (1988-1992); Icelandic Team of the 20th century; 8x Icelandic league champion (1981, 1982, 1984–1987, 1994, 1995); 2× Icelandic Basketball Cup (1987, 1988); Icelandic Company Cup (1999); Úrvalsdeild karla all-time career scoring leader; Icelandic All-Star Game MVP (1989); Icelandic All-Star Dunk contest champion (1986); As coach: Úrvalsdeild karla Coach of the year (2000); 3x Icelandic men's league champion (1988, 1994, 1995); 2× Icelandic Men's Basketball Cup (1987, 1988); Icelandic Men's Company Cup (1999); Icelandic men's Division I champion (2004); Danish men's Division II champion (1996)

Career Úrvalsdeild karla playing statistics
- Points: 7,355 (18.4 ppg)
- Games: 400

Career coaching record
- Úrvalsdeild karla: 240–152 (.612)
- Úrvalsdeild kvenna: 7–27 (.206)
Medals
Men's basketball
Representing Iceland
Games of the Small States of Europe
Bronze medal – third place	1989 Cyprus	National Team
Gold medal – first place	1991 Andorra	National Team
Gold medal – first place	1993 Malta	National Team
Bronze medal – third place	1995 Luxembourg	National Team
FIBA European Championship for Small Countries
Gold medal – first place	1988 Malta	National Team
Gold medal – first place	1990 Wales	National Team
Bronze medal – third place	1994 Ireland	National Team

Valur Snjólfur Ingimundarson (born 20 February 1962) is an Icelandic former basketball player and coach. He played for 20 seasons in the Icelandic Úrvalsdeild and is its highest scoring player of all time. He won the Icelandic championship eight times during his career and the Icelandic Cup twice.

== Denmark ==
Valur was a player-coach for Odense BK from 1995 to 1998 and helped the club achieve promotion up two levels in two seasons and to the Danish top-tier league in 1997. He left Odense after the 1997–1998 season and to over as head coach for Tindastóll.

== Icelandic national team ==
Valur is the second most capped player in the national team history, playing 164 games between 1980 and 1995.

== Team of the 20th century ==
In 2001 Valur was voted to the Icelandic team of the 20th century in basketball as a player.

== Personal life ==
Valur is the older brother of Sigurður Ingimundarson, the winningest coach in Icelandic basketball history, and the father of basketball player Valur Orri Valsson.
