= Úrvalsdeild Women's Domestic Player of the Year =

The Women's Domestic Player of the Year is an award for the top-tier basketball league in Iceland, the women's Úrvalsdeild.

== All-time award winners ==
The following is a list of the all-time Úrvalsdeild Women's Domestic Player of the Year winners.

Season	Player	Team
1981–1982	(Iceland) Emilía Sigurðardóttir	KR
1982–1983	(Iceland) Linda Jónsdóttir	KR
1983–1984	(Iceland) Sóley Indriðadóttir	Haukar
1984–1985	(Iceland) Sigrún Cora Barker	KR
1985–1986	(Iceland) Linda Jónsdóttir	KR
1986–1987	(Iceland) Linda Jónsdóttir (3x)	KR
1987–1988	(Iceland) Anna María Sveinsdóttir	Keflavík
1988–1989	(Iceland) Anna María Sveinsdóttir (2x)	Keflavík
1989–1990	(Iceland) Björg Hafsteinsdóttir	Keflavík
1990–1991	(Iceland) Linda Stefánsdóttir	ÍR
1991–1992	(Iceland) Hanna Björg Kjartansdóttir	Haukar
1992–1993	(Iceland) Linda Stefánsdóttir (2x)	ÍR
1993–1994	(Iceland) Olga Færseth	Keflavík
1994–1995	(Iceland) Anna María Sveinsdóttir (3x)	Keflavík
1995–1996	(Iceland) Anna María Sveinsdóttir (4x)	Keflavík
1996–1997	(Iceland) Guðbjörg Norðfjörð	KR
1997–1998	(Iceland) Anna María Sveinsdóttir (5x)	Keflavík
1998–1999	(Iceland) Anna María Sveinsdóttir (6x)	Keflavík
1999–2000	(Iceland) Erla Þorsteinsdóttir	Keflavík
2000–2001	(Iceland) Kristín Björk Jónsdóttir	KR
2001–2002	(Iceland) Alda Leif Jónsdóttir	ÍS
2002–2003	(Iceland) Hildur Sigurðardóttir	KR
2003–2004	(Iceland) Hildur Sigurðardóttir (2x)	KR
2004–2005	(Iceland) Helena Sverrisdóttir	Haukar
2005–2006	(Iceland) Helena Sverrisdóttir (2x)	Haukar
2006–2007	(Iceland) Helena Sverrisdóttir (3x)	Haukar
2007–2008	(Iceland) Pálína Gunnlaugsdóttir	Keflavík
2008–2009	(Iceland) Signý Hermannsdóttir	Valur
2009–2010	(Iceland) Signý Hermannsdóttir (2x)	KR
2010–2011	(Iceland) Margrét Kara Sturludóttir	KR
2011–2012	(Iceland) Pálína Gunnlaugsdóttir (2x)	Keflavík
2012–2013	(Iceland) Pálína Gunnlaugsdóttir (3x)	Keflavík
2013–2014	(Iceland) Hildur Sigurðardóttir (3x)	Snæfell
2014–2015	(Iceland) Hildur Sigurðardóttir (4x)	Snæfell
2015–2016	(Iceland) Helena Sverrisdóttir (4x)	Haukar
2016–2017	(Iceland) Thelma Dís Ágústsdóttir	Keflavík
2017–2018	(Iceland) Helena Sverrisdóttir (5x)	Haukar
2018–2019	(Iceland) Helena Sverrisdóttir (6x)	Valur
2019–2020	None selected after season was canceled due to the coronavirus pandemic in Iceland	
2020–2021	(Iceland) Sara Rún Hinriksdóttir	Haukar
2021–2022	(Iceland) Dagný Lísa Davíðsdóttir	Fjölnir
2022–2023	(Iceland) Eva Margrét Kristjánsdóttir	Haukar
