= Margrét Sturlaugsdóttir =

Icelandic basketball player and coach

Personal information
- Born: 1 July 1968 (age 58) Keflavík, Iceland

Career information
- College: Charleston Southern (1991–1993)
- Playing career: 1986–1999
- Position: Guard

Career history

Playing
- 1986–1991: Keflavík
- 1995–1997: Keflavík
- 1999: Keflavík

Coaching
- 2011: Iceland U-16
- 2014–2015: Iceland (assistant)
- 2015–2016: Keflavík
- 2018: Breiðablik
- 2020–2021: Stjarnan

Career highlights
- As player: 4× Icelandic champion (1988–1990, 1996); 5× Icelandic Basketball Cup (1988–1990, 1996, 1997); 2× Icelandic Supercup (1996, 1997)
Medals
Women's basketball
Representing Iceland
Games of the Small States of Europe
| Silver medal – second place | 1989 Cyprus | Team |
| Bronze medal – third place | 1991 Andorra | Team |
Assistant Coach for Iceland
Games of the Small States of Europe
| Silver medal – second place | 2015 Iceland | Team |

Margrét Sturlaugsdóttir (born 1 July 1968) is an Icelandic basketball coach and former member of the Icelandic women's national basketball team.

== Playing career ==
=== Club career ===
Margrét came up through the junior teams of Keflavík.

=== National team career ===
Margrét played 6 games for the Icelandic women's national basketball team. She won silver at the 1989 Games of the Small States of Europe and bronze at the 1991 Games.

== Coaching career ==
Margrét was hired as an assistant coach to the women's national team in 2014. She helped Iceland finish second on the 2015 Games of the Small States of Europe.

In May 2015, Margrét was hired as the head coach of Keflavík in the Úrvalsdeild kvenna.

In October 2015, Margrét stepped down from the coaching staff of the national team due to a rift between her and her former player with Keflavík and then national team player, Bryndís Guðmundsdóttir.

In January 2016, with Keflavík in third place, the board terminated its contract with Margrét, stemming from a rift between her and two players, including key-player Sandra Lind Þrastardóttir.

On April 18, 2018, Margrét was hired as the head coach of Breiðablik, replacing Hildur Sigurðardóttir. On 14 November 2018, she resigned from her post for health reasons.

On 21 July 2019, she became the first Icelandic woman to receive the FIBA Europe coaching certificate.

On 21 August 2019, Margrét was hired as the head coach of Stjarnan women's youth teams. Prior to the 2020–21 season, Stjarnan fielded a women's senior team again with Margrét appointed as head coach. In October 2020, she was criticized for taking the team on a training trip to Hrútafjörður when all practices and games where barred in the capital region due to another Covid-19 outbreak in Iceland. In April 2021, she was replaced as head coach by Pálína Gunnlaugsdóttir.

== Personal life ==
Margrét is married to former Icelandic international basketball player, Falur Harðarson. They have four daughters, Lovísa Falsdóttir, Elfa Falsdóttir, Urður Falsdóttir and Jana Falsdóttir.

In 2017, Margrét was diagnosed with cancer.
