= Símon Ólafsson =

Icelandic basketball player

Personal information
- Born: July 15, 1956 (age 70) Iceland
- Listed height: 200 cm (6 ft 7 in)

Career information
- College: Cornell (1975–1977)
- Playing career: 1973–1993
- Position: Center

Career history
- 1973–1977: Ármann
- 1977–1987: Fram
- 1987–1988: KR
- 1990–1993: Valur

Career highlights
- Icelandic basketball team of the 20th century; Icelandic Basketball Player of the Year (1981); Icelandic champion (1976); Icelandic Cup (1975, 1982); 1. deild karla (1979, 1981, 1986)

Símon Ólafsson (born 15 July 1956) is an Icelandic former basketball player and a former member of Icelandic national team. He won the Icelandic championship in 1976 and the Icelandic Cup 1975 and 1982. In 1981, he was named the Icelandic Basketball Player of the Year. In 2001, Símon was named as one of the twelve best Icelandic men's basketball players of the 20th century.

== Playing career ==
Símon started his career with Ármann in 1973 at the age of 17.

In 1975, Símon enrolled in Cornell University where he also trained basketball. On 3 January 1976, he played again with Ármann in a 90-89 victory against ÍR, scoring a game high 33 points. After the game, ÍR filed an official complaint, claiming that Símon was not a legal player for Ármann in the game as he was training with a college team in the United States. Símon and Ármann fought back, claiming that Símon was not an official player for Cornell, as first year students where not allowed on the main squad and that no paperwork had been filed regarding his transfer from Ármann.

In 1977, Símon transferred over to rival Reykjavík club Fram. In 1979, he won the 1. deild karla with the club. In 1982, he helped the club to victory in the Icelandic Basketball Cup, scoring 16 points in the Cup finals victory against KR.

He retired following the 1992–1993 season.

== Icelandic national team ==
Símon played 89 games for the Icelandic national team from 1976 to 1986.

== Awards and accomplishments ==
=== Titles ===
- Icelandic champion: 1976
- Icelandic Cup (2): 1975, 1982
- 1. deild karla (3): 1979, 1981, 1986

=== Individual awards ===
- Icelandic basketball team of the 20th century
- Icelandic Basketball Player of the Year: 1981
