= Geir Hallsteinsson =

Icelandic handball player (born 1946)

Personal information
- Nationality: Icelandic
- Born: 7 August 1946 (age 80) Iceland
- Height: 185 cm (73 in)

Sport
- Sport: Handball
National team
Years	Team	Apps	(Gls)
–	Iceland	118	(531)

Geir Hallsteinsson (born 7 August 1946) is an Icelandic former handball player who competed in the 1972 Summer Olympics. He played 118 games for the Icelandic national handball team, scoring 531 goals. He was named the Icelandic Sportsperson of the Year in 1968 and in 2016 he was inducted in to the National Olympic and Sports Association of Iceland Hall of Fame.
