= Erla Þorsteinsdóttir (basketball) =

Icelandic basketball player

Personal information
- Born: 8 March 1978 (age 48) Keflavík, Iceland

Career information
- College: AUM (1998–1999)
- Playing career: 1993–2005
- Position: Power forward / center
- Number: 14

Career history
- 1993–2004: Keflavík
- 2004–2005: Grindavík
- 2005: Keflavík

Career highlights
- Icelandic Team of the 20th century; Icelandic Women's Basketball Player of the Year (2000); Úrvalsdeild Domestic Player of the Year (2000); 5× Úrvalsdeild Domestic All-First Team (1998, 2000, 2002–2004); 6× Icelandic champion (1994, 1996, 1998, 2000, 2003, 2004); 7× Icelandic Basketball Cup (1994–1998, 2000, 2004); 3× Icelandic Supercup (1996, 2001, 2003); 2× Icelandic Company Cup (2002, 2003); Icelandic All-Star Game MVP (2004); 2× Icelandic All-Star (2004, 2005)

Erla Þorsteinsdóttir (born 8 March 1978) is an Icelandic former basketball player. She was a key player on the Keflavík team that won six Icelandic championships and seven Icelandic basketball cups during her stay there. In 2001 she was voted as one of the twelve players on the team of the 20th century. She was named the Úrvalsdeild Domestic Player of the Year in 2000.

== Early life ==
Erla was born in Keflavík in 1978. She started practicing basketball with Keflavík at the age of 11. She was a promising golfer in her youth and was a member of the Icelandic junior national golf teams. Following her retirement from basketball due to injuries, she returned to practicing golf.

== National team career ==
Between 1995 and 2004, Erla played 34 games for the Icelandic national basketball team.
