= Linda Stefánsdóttir =

Icelandic basketball player (born 1972)

Personal information
- Born: 28 June 1972 (age 54) Iceland
- Listed height: 172 cm (5 ft 8 in)

Career information
- Playing career: 1987–2002
- Position: Guard

Career history
- 1987–1993: ÍR
- 1993–1995: Valur
- 1995–1996: ÍR
- 1996–2002: KR

Career highlights
- Icelandic Team of the 20th century; 2x Úrvalsdeild Domestic Player of the Year (1991, 1993); 7x Úrvalsdeild Domestic All-First Team (1990–1996); 2x Icelandic champion (1999, 2002); 2× Icelandic Basketball Cup (1999, 2002); Icelandic Supercup (1999); Úrvalsdeild scoring champion (1993); 2×Úrvalsdeild assists leader (1995, 1996); 4× Úrvalsdeild steals leader (1995–1997, 1999)

Career Úrvalsdeild kvenna statistics
- Points: 3,306 (13.8 ppg)
- Games: 240
Medals
Women's basketball
Representing Iceland
Games of the Small States of Europe
Silver medal – second place	1989 Cyprus	Team
Bronze medal – third place	1991 Andorra	Team
Silver medal – second place	1993 Malta	Team
Silver medal – second place	1995 Luxembourg	Team
Gold medal – first place	1997 Iceland	Team
FIBA European Championship for Small Countries
Gold medal – first place	1996 Malta	National Team

Linda Stefánsdóttir (born 28 June 1972) is an Icelandic former basketball player and a former member of the Icelandic national basketball team. She played 14 seasons in the Úrvalsdeild kvenna, winning the Icelandic championship and the Icelandic Basketball Cup in 1999 and 2002. In 2001 she was named one of the twelve players of the Icelandic basketball team of the 20th century by the Icelandic Basketball Federation. She was one of the premium defenders during her career, leading the Úrvalsdeild in steals four times.

== Early life ==
Linda grew up in Vík í Mýrdal where she competed in track and field. She was introduced to basketball at the age of fourteen when she moved to Reykjavík.

== Career ==
Linda debuted with ÍR on 19 October 1987, scoring 8 points in ÍR's 46–43 loss against ÍS. After her fourth season, she was named the Domestic Player of the Year.

Linda led the league in scoring during the 1992–1993 season, averaging 20.9 points per game, helping the team finish second in the league behind Keflavík. For her effort, she was named the Domestic Player of the Year for the second time in her career.

She left ÍR prior to the 1993–1994 season along with many of her teammates, due to their disfaction with the club's lack of interest in the women's team, and joined Valur. During her second season with Valur, Linda averaged 19.5 points, and league leading 4.1 assists and 6.9 steals.

After one season back with ÍR, where she averaged 17.1 points and led the league with 5.2 assists and 6.3 steals, Linda transferred to KR in October 1996.

In 1999, Linda won her first national championship and first Icelandic Basketball Cup after KR swept the season, winning all 25 regular season and playoff games, and all 3 cup games.

On 24 February 2000, Linda injured her knee in a game against Keflavík. The injury was severe and she ended missing both the rest of the season and the 2000–2001 season. She returned to the court on 7 December 2001, 21-months after the injury.

On 9 February 2002, she won the Icelandic Basketball Cup for the second time after KR beat Njarðvík 81–74 in the cup final.

In April 2002, Linda helped KR overcome a 0–2 deficit against ÍS in the Úrvalsdeild finals to win the national championship for the second year in a row.

In 2003 she had a brief comeback with KR when she appeared in one game during the pre-season Reykjavík Tournament, scoring 2 points.

== Úrvalsdeild statistics ==
†	Denotes seasons in which Linda won the national championship
*	Led the league

=== Regular season statistics ===
Year	Team	GP	MPG	2P%	3P%	FT%	RPG	APG	SPG	BPG	PPG
1987–88	ÍR	17	-	-	-	.474	-	-	-	-	7.5
1988–89	ÍR	18	-	-	-	.479	-	-	-	-	14.8
1989–90	ÍR	18	-	-	-	.515	-	-	-	-	14.7
1990–91	ÍR	15	-	-	-	.600	-	-	-	-	14.1
1991–92	ÍR	20	-	-	-	.392	-	-	-	-	17.7
1992–93	ÍR	15	-	-	-	.462	-	-	-	-	20.9*
1993–94	Valur	18	-	-	-	.618	-	-	-	-	15.6
1994–95	Valur	24	-	.445	.242	.605	7.7	4.1*	6.9*	0.5	19.5
1995–96	ÍR	17	-	.484	.192	.711	6.3	5.2*	6.3*	0.6	17.1
1996–97	KR	14	20.5	.500	.120	.690	5.8	2.9	5.2*	0.4	16.5
1997–98	KR	14	22.1	.435	.000	.586	4.4	2.0	2.7	0.1	6.9
1998–99†	KR	20	26.9	.546	.000	.578	5.8	1.4	4.4*	0.6	10.2
1999–00	KR	16	22.5	.439	.300	.444	4.5	2.8	4.2	0.3	9.1
2001–02†	KR	14	18.0	.404	.176	.636	3.4	1.6	2.6	0.6	3.9
Career		240	-	-	-	.558	-	-	-	-	13.8

=== Playoffs statistics ===
Year	Team	GP	MPG	2P%	3P%	FT%	RPG	APG	SPG	BPG	TP	PPG
1993	ÍR	2	-	-	-	-	-	-	-	-	30	15.0
1997	KR	5	-	.258	.250	.750	5.4	1.4	4.6	0.4	22	4.4
1998	KR	6	27.7	.457	-	.125	4.2	0.8	3.5	0.0	33	5.5
1999†	KR	6	27.0	.500	.500	.375	5.8	1.4	4.4	0.4	30	6.0
2002†	KR	8	21.6	.300	.273	.556	3.9	1.5	1.8	0.5	37	4.6
Career		27	-	-	-	-	-	-	-	-	152	5.6

Note: Rebounds, assists, steals and blocks where first tracked during the 1993–94 season. Minutes where first tracked during the 1996–97 season.

== Icelandic national team ==
Between 1989 and 1999, Linda played 39 games for the Icelandic national basketball team.
