= ÍSÍ Hall of Fame =

- Established: 2012
- Location: Reykjavík, Iceland
- Type: Hall of Fame
- Website: Official website

The ÍSÍ Hall of Fame is the hall of fame of the National Olympic and Sports Association of Iceland (Icelandic: Íþrótta- og Ólympíusamband Íslands). It was founded in 2012 during ÍSÍ's 100th anniversary.

== Inductees ==
Year	Name	Sport
2012	Vilhjálmur Einarsson	Track and field
2012	Bjarni Friðriksson	Judo
2012	Vala Flosadóttir	Track and field
2013	Jóhannes Jósefsson	Glíma
2013	Sigurjón Pétursson	Glíma
2013	Albert Guðmundsson	Football
2013	Kristín Rós Hákonardóttir	Swimming
2015	Ásgeir Sigurvinsson	Football
2015	Pétur Guðmundsson	Basketball
2015	Gunnar Huseby	Track and field
2015	Torfi Bryngeirsson	Track and field
2015	Ríkharður Jónsson	Football
2015	Sigríður Sigurðardóttir	Handball
2016	Guðmundur Gíslason	Swimming
2016	Geir Hallsteinsson	Handball
2017	Jón Kaldal	Track and field
2017	Skúli Óskarsson	Power lifting
2018	Hreinn Halldórsson	Track and field
2019	Alfreð Gíslason	Handball
2020	Haukur Gunnarsson	Track and field
2021	Haukur Clausen	Track and field
2021	Örn Clausen	Track and field
2021	Einar Vilhjálmsson	Track and field
2022	Guðrún Arnardóttir	Track and field
2024	Sigrún Huld Hrafnsdóttir	Swimming
2025	Sigurbjörn Bárðarson	Equestrian
2026	Jón Arnar Magnússon	Track and field
