= Jón Kr. Gíslason =

Icelandic basketball player and coach

Personal information
- Born: October 14, 1962 (age 64) Iceland

Career information
- Playing career: 1984–2011
- Position: Point guard
- Number: 14
- Coaching career: 1983–2009

Career history

Playing
- 1984–1989: Keflavík
- 1989–1990: SISU
- 1991-1996: Keflavík
- 1996-1997: Grindavík
- 2000-2001: Stjarnan
- 2009-2011: Stjarnan-b
- 2011: Stjarnan

Coaching
- 1983–1984: Njarðvík (women's)
- 1987–1989: Keflavík (women's)
- 1988–1989: Keflavík (men's)
- 1990–1996: Keflavík (men's)
- 1995-1999: Iceland (men's)
- 1998: Iceland (women's)
- 1999: Fylkir (men's)
- 2000–2001: Stjarnan (men's)
- 2009: Stjarnan (men's)

Career highlights
- As player: 4x Icelandic Basketball Player of the Year; Úrvalsdeild Domestic Player of the year (1993); 6x Úrvalsdeild Domestic All-First team (1987, 1988, 1991-1994); Icelandic Team of the 20th century; 3x Icelandic champion (1989, 1992, 1993); 2× Icelandic Basketball Cup (1993, 1994); Icelandic Superup (1996); Danish Cup (1989); 7x Úrvalsdeild assist leader (1988, 1989, 1991–1994, 1997); As coach: 3x Icelandic men's league champion (1989, 1992, 1993); 2x Icelandic women's league champion (1988, 1989); 2× Icelandic Men's Basketball Cup (1993, 1994); 2× Icelandic Women's Basketball Cup (1988, 1989)

Career Úrvalsdeild karla playing statistics
- Points: 3,678 (12.0 ppg)
- Games: 307

Career coaching record
- Úrvalsdeild karla: 132–146 (.475)
- Úrvalsdeild kvenna: 36–16 (.692)
Medals
Men's basketball
Representing Iceland
Games of the Small States of Europe
Bronze medal – third place	1989 Cyprus	National Team
Gold medal – first place	1991 Andorra	National Team
Gold medal – first place	1993 Malta	National Team
Bronze medal – third place	1995 Luxembourg	National Team
FIBA European Championship for Small Countries
Gold medal – first place	1988 Malta	National Team
Gold medal – first place	1990 Wales	National Team
Bronze medal – third place	1994 Ireland	National Team

Jón Kristinn Gíslason (born 14 October 1962) is an Icelandic former professional basketball player and a coach. A four-time Icelandic Basketball Player of the Year, he won three national championships and two Icelandic Basketball Cups with Keflavík.

== Icelandic national basketball team ==
Between 1982 and 1995, Jón played 158 games for the Icelandic national team. He coached the national team from 1995 to 1999 when his contract was not renewed. In 1998, he served as the head coach of the Icelandic women's national basketball team during the Promotion Cup.

== Team of the 20th century ==
In 2001 Jón was voted to the Icelandic team of the 20th century in basketball as a player.

== Family ==
Jón is the father of Úrvalsdeild players Dagur Kár Jónsson, Daði Lár Jónsson and Dúi Þór Jónsson.
