= Icelandic basketball team of the 20th century =

The Team of the 20th Century in Icelandic basketball was chosen in 2001. The selection of the men's team was made by a 50-person panel while a 25-person panel selected the women's team.

== Men's team of the century ==
Player of the century
Pétur Guðmundsson

Starting five
F - Valur Ingimundarson
F - Teitur Örlygsson
C - Pétur Guðmundsson
G - Jón Sigurðsson
G - Jón Kr. Gíslason

Bench
G - Þorsteinn Hallgrímsson
F - Torfi Magnússon
F - Símon Ólafsson
G - Kolbeinn Pálsson
C - Einar Bollason
F - Guðmundur Bragason
G - Pálmar Sigurðsson

== Women's team of the century ==
Player of the century
Anna María Sveinsdóttir

Starting five
F - Linda Stefánsdóttir
F - Guðbjörg Norðfjörð
C - Anna María Sveinsdóttir
G - Linda Jónsdóttir
G - Björg Hafsteinsdóttir

Bench
F - Hanna Björg Kjartansdóttir
G - Alda Leif Jónsdóttir
F - Erla Þorsteinsdóttir
C - Kolbrún Leifsdóttir
F - Hafdís Helgadóttir
G - Emilía Sigurðardóttir
G - Erla Reynisdóttir

== Coaches of the century ==
- Einar Bollason
- Friðrik Ingi Rúnarsson

== Referees of the century ==
- Jón Otti Ólafsson
- Leifur S. Garðarsson

== See also ==
- List of the best Czech basketball players of the 20th century
