= Leifur Garðarsson =

Icelandic former basketball referee

- Born: 23 February 1968 (age 58); Iceland
- Height: 1.71 m (5 ft 7 in)
- Basketball career

Personal information
- Listed weight: 71 kg (157 lb)
- Position: Guard
- Officiating career: 1987–2004, 2013–2020

Career history
- 1984–1986: Haukar

Career highlights
- As player: 2× Icelandic Basketball Cup (1985, 1986); As referee: Icelandic Co-Referee of the Century; 8× Icelandic Referee of the Year (1992, 1997, 1999–2004)
Association football career
- Position: Midfielder
Youth career
- FH
Senior career*
Years	Team	Apps	(Gls)
1985–1988	FH		
1989	Þór Akureyri	2	(0)
1990	FH	3	(0)
1991	Íþróttafélag Kópavogs		
1992	FH	2	(0)
1993	Sindri Höfn		
1996	FH	1	(0)
Managerial career
- 1995: FH (assistant)
- 2003–2005: FH (assistant)
- 2006–2008: Fylkir
- 2009–2010: Víkingur R.
- * Club domestic league appearances and goals

Leifur Sigfinnur Garðarsson (born 23 February 1968) is an Icelandic former basketball referee, multi-sport athlete and football manager.

== Basketball ==
=== Referee career ===
Leifur started refereeing in 1987. During the 1991 Úrvalsdeild karla playoffs, Leifur was hit by a fan and threatened violence following a match between bitter rivals Njarðvík and Keflavík. He retired from refereeing in 2004 to focus on furthering his football managing career but returned in 2013.

He was a FIBA referee from 1993 to 2004 and again from 2014 to 2018 when he retired due to age restrictions for international referees.

=== Titles and awards ===
==== Titles ====
- Icelandic Basketball Cup (2)
  - 1985, 1986

==== Awards ====
- Icelandic Basketball Referee of the Year (8)
  - 1992, 1997, 1999, 2000, 2001, 2002, 2003, 2004

== Football ==
Leifur played several seasons in the Icelandic top-tier Úrvalsdeild karla with Fimleikafélag Hafnarfjarðar and Þór Akureyri. He was an assistant manager to FH from 2003 to 2005. He was the manager of Fylkir from 2006 to 2008 and Knattspyrnufélagið Víkingur from 2008 to 2011.

=== Titles ===
- 1. deild karla
  - 2010
