= Hrefna Ingimarsdóttir =

Icelandic athletic trainer and educator

Personal information
- Born: 30 August 1931 Hnífsdalur, Kingdom of Iceland
- Died: 26 September 2005 (aged 74) Kópavogur, Iceland

Career history

Coaching
- 1950–1959: ÍR

Career highlights
- 3× Icelandic champion (1956–1958)

Hrefna Ingimarsdóttir (30 August 1931 – 26 September 2005) was an Icelandic athletic coach, trainer and educator. She was a pioneer in women's basketball in Iceland in the 1950s and the first coach of the ÍR women's basketball team which she led to three national championships.

== Early life ==
Hrefna was born in Hnífsdalur and graduated from Gagnfræðskóli Ísafjarðar and then from the Íþróttakennaraskólanum at Laugarvatn where she learned basketball from Sigríður Valgeirsdóttir.

== Personal life ==
Hrefna was married to Ingi Þór Stefánsson, himself a basketball player, from 1957 until his death in 1966.

== Titles ==
- Icelandic champion (3): 1956, 1957, 1958
