= Sigurður Ingimundarson =

Icelandic basketball coach and player

Personal information
- Born: 14 June 1966 (age 60)
- Listed height: 193 cm (6 ft 4 in)
- Listed weight: 91 kg (201 lb)

Career information
- Playing career: 1982–2001
- Position: Small forward
- Number: 12
- Coaching career: 1991–2016; 2025–present

Career history

Playing
- 1982–1996: Keflavík
- 1998–1999: Keflavík
- 2000–2001: Keflavík

Coaching
- 1991–1996: Keflavík (Women's)
- 1995–1997: Iceland (Women's)
- 1996–2003: Keflavík (Men's)
- 2001–2002: Iceland (Women's)
- 2004–2009: Keflavík (Men's)
- 2004–2009: Iceland (Men's)
- 2009: Solna Vikings (Men's)
- 2009–2011: Njarðvík (Men's)
- 2011–2013: Keflavík (Men's)
- 2012–2013: Keflavík (Women's)
- 2014–2015: Keflavík (Women's)
- 2014–2016: Keflavík (Men's)
- 2025: Keflavík (Women's)
- 2025: Keflavík (Men's)

Career highlights
- As player: 3× Icelandic League champion (1989, 1992, 1993); 2× Icelandic Basketball Cup (1993, 1994); As coach: Úrvalsdeild Men's Coach of the Year (Iceland) (2008); Úrvalsdeild Women's Coach of the Year (Women's) (Iceland) (2013); 5× Icelandic men´s League champion (1997, 1999, 2003, 2005, 2008); 6× Icelandic women´s League champion (1992–1994, 1996, 2004, 2013); 3× Icelandic Men's Basketball Cup (1997, 2003, 2012); 5× Icelandic Women's Basketball Cup (1993-1996, 2013); 2× Icelandic Men's Supercup (1997, 2008); 5× Icelandic Men's Company Cup (1996–1998, 2002, 2006); Icelandic Women's Company Cup (2014)

Career Úrvalsdeild karla statistics
- Points: 3,130 (11.1 ppg)
- Games: 283

Sigurður Þorbjörn Ingimundarson (born 14 June 1966) is an Icelandic basketball coach and former player. He is the winningest coach in Icelandic basketball history for both genders, both in terms of national championships and career wins.

In 2009, Sigurður was hired as the head coach of Solna Vikings. He left after only two games due to a disagreement with the board regarding how to build up the team, claiming he was not happy with the boards insistence on adding more American players to ensure short-term success.

In October 2016, Sigurður was forced to step down as head coach of Keflavík in the Úrvalsdeild karla for health reasons.

In January 2025, he resumed his coaching career and took over Keflavík women's team once again, replacing Friðrik Ingi Rúnarsson who resigned in December. In February 2025, he also took over the men's team until the rest of the season, replacing Pétur Ingvarsson.

== Personal life ==
Sigurður is the younger brother of Valur Ingimundarson, the highest scoring player in the Icelandic Úrvalsdeild history, and the uncle of basketball player Valur Orri Valsson.
