= Linda Jónsdóttir =

Icelandic basketball player (1956–2019)

Personal information
- Born: 10 March 1956 Patreksfjörður, Iceland
- Died: 13 December 2019 (aged 63) Mosfellsbær, Iceland

Career information
- Playing career: 1972–1990
- Position: Guard

Career history
- 1972–1983: KR
- 1984–1990: KR

Career highlights
- Icelandic Team of the 20th century; Icelandic Basketball Player of the Year (1982); 3x Úrvalsdeild Domestic Player of the Year (1983, 1986, 1987); Úrvalsdeild Domestic All-First Team (1989); 9× Icelandic champion (1977, 1979–1983, 1985–1987); 6× Icelandic Basketball Cup (1976, 1977, 1982, 1983, 1986, 1987); 4x Úrvalsdeild scoring champion (1983, 1986, 1987, 1989)
Medals
Women's basketball
Representing Iceland
Games of the Small States of Europe
Silver medal – second place	1989 Cyprus	Team

Jórunn Linda Jónsdóttir (10 March 1956 – 13 December 2019) was an Icelandic multi-sport athlete. In 1982 she became the first woman to be named the Icelandic Basketball Player of the Year. She won the Icelandic championship nine times and the Icelandic Basketball Cup six times. She also competed in football and track and field.

== Early life ==
Linda was born in Patreksfjörður in the Westfjords of Iceland. She first played basketball with the local club Hörður.

== Basketball ==
=== Club career ===
Linda started her career with KR in 1972 and in 1976, she won her first major title when KR won the Icelandic Basketball Cup. In 1982 she finished second in the vote for Player of the year and in scoring, behind Emilía Sigurðardóttir. In December, she was voted as the Icelandic Basketball Player of the Year. In 1983, Linda was named the Player of the year after helping KR win its fifth national championship in a row, while also leading the league in scoring with 344 points.

After spending the 1983-1984 season playing in Sweden, Linda returned to KR prior to the 1984-1985 season and helped them win the 1985 championship. In 1986, she won every major individual award awarded that season as she was named the Player of the year while also leading the league in scoring and free-throw percent. With her, KR won both the national championship and the Icelandic Basketball Cup. In the Cup Finals, Linda outscored ÍS by herself, scoring 33 points for KR in the 47-28 victory. She continued her dominance the following season, winning all the major awards again along with the national championship and the Basketball Cup.

Linda only appeared in 3 games during the 1987–1988 season, averaging 15.0 points per game, and KR finished dead last in the league with only 3 victories in 18 games. She bounced back during the following season, playing all 18 games and again leading the league in scoring.

=== Icelandic national team ===
Linda was named to the first Icelandic women's national basketball team in 1973. In 1989, she played for Iceland during the Games of the Small States of Europe, helping Iceland finish second.

== Team of the 20th century ==
In 2001 Linda was voted to the Icelandic team of the 20th century in basketball as a player.
