= Falur Harðarson =

Icelandic basketball player and coach

KV
- Title: Head coach
- League: 1. deild karla

Personal information
- Born: 15 October 1968 (age 58)

Career information
- College: Charleston Southern (1991–1993)
- Playing career: 1986–2004
- Position: Point guard
- Number: 4
- Coaching career: 1989–2020

Career history

Playing
- 1986–1991: Keflavík
- 1994–1995: KR
- 1995–1999: Keflavík
- 1999–2000: Torpan Pojat
- 2000: Espoon Honka
- 2000–2004: Keflavík

Coaching
- 1989–1991: Keflavík (Women's)
- 2003–2004: Keflavík (Men's)
- 2010–2011: Keflavík (Women's, assistant)
- 2011–2012: Keflavík (Women's)
- 2017–2020: Fjölnir (Men's)
- 2024–present: KV (Men's)

Career highlights
- As player: Úrvalsdeild Domestic Player of the Year (1999); 5× Úrvalsdeild Domestic All-First Team (1991, 1995, 1997–1999); 5× Icelandic League champion (1989, 1997, 1999, 2003, 2004); 3× Icelandic Basketball Cup (1997, 2003, 2004); 2× Icelandic Supercup (1997, 2003); As coach: Icelandic men's league champion (2004); Icelandic women's league champion (1990); Icelandic Men's Basketball Cup (2004); Icelandic Women's Basketball Cup (1990); Icelandic Men's Supercup (2003)

Career coaching record
- Úrvalsdeild karla: 15–7 (.682)
- Úrvalsdeild kvenna: 46–13 (.780)

Falur Jóhann Harðarson (born 15 October 1968) is an Icelandic basketball coach and a former player. He spent most of his career with Keflavík where he won five national championships, the last one as a player-coach, and 3 national cups. A five time Úrvalsdeild Domestic All-First Team selection, he was named the Úrvalsdeild Domestic Player of the Year in 1999.

Falur started his coaching career with Keflavík women's team and led them to the national championship in 1990.

== Playing career ==
=== Club career ===
Falur spent most of his career with Úrvalsdeild club Keflavík. He also played one and a half season with Reykjavík powerhouse KR and split the 1999–2000 season with Korisliiga clubs Torpan Pojat and Espoon Honka.

He retired after the 2003–2004 season after being plagued by knee injuries.

=== College career ===
Falur attended Charleston Southern from 1991 to 1993 where he played college basketball.

=== National team career ===
From 1989 to 2000, Falur played 106 games for the Icelandic national basketball team.

== Coaching career ==
Falur started his coaching career with Keflavík women's team and led them to the national championship in his first season.

During the 2003–2004 season, he served as a player-coach for Keflavík men's team and led them to the national championship.

He was an assistant coach to Keflavík women's team during the 2010–2011 before taking over as head coach for the 2011–2012 season. He led the team to the best record in the league but resigned after it was ousted from the semi-finals of the 2012 playoffs.

Falur was hired as the head coach of Fjölnir men's team in 2017 and helped the team gain promotion to the Úrvalsdeild karla in 2019. He resigned following its relegation back to 1. deild karla in 2020.

In 2024, Falur was hired as the head coach of KV.

== Personal life ==
Falur is married to former Icelandic women's national team player, Margrét Sturlaugsdóttir. They have four daughters Lovísa Falsdóttir, Elfa Falsdóttir, Urður Falsdóttir and Jana Falsdóttir.

In 2009, Falur was hired as the human resource manager of the Samkaup convenience store chain. In August 2022, he was hired as director of e-commerce and educational solutions at Advania.

== Awards and honours ==
=== As player ===
==== Club ====
- 5× Icelandic League champion (1989, 1997, 1999, 2003, 2004)
- 3× Icelandic Basketball Cup (1997, 2003, 2004)
- 2× Icelandic Supercup (1997, 2003)

==== Individual ====
- 5× Úrvalsdeild Domestic All-First Team (1991, 1995, 1997–1999)
- Úrvalsdeild Domestic Player of the Year (1999)
- Úrvalsdeild Young Player of the Year (1987)

=== As coach ===
- Icelandic Men's League champion (2004)
- Icelandic Women's League champion (1990)
- Icelandic Men's Basketball Cup (2004)
- Icelandic Women's Basketball Cup (1990)
- Icelandic Men's Supercup (2003)
