= Jón Halldór Eðvaldsson =

Icelandic basketball coach (born 1975)

Personal information
- Born: March 13, 1975 (age 51)
- Coaching career: 2006–present

Career history

Coaching
- 2004: Iceland U-16
- 2006–2011: Keflavík
- 2010: Iceland U-16
- 2009: Iceland (assistant)
- 2013–2014: Grindavík
- 2019–2022: Keflavík
- 2025: Keflavík (assistant)

Career highlights
- 2× Úrvalsdeild Coach of the Year (2008, 2011); 2× Icelandic champion (2008, 2011); Icelandic Basketball Cup (2011); 2× Icelandic Supercup (2007, 2008); 3× Icelandic Company Cup (2007, 2008, 2010)
Medals
Assistant Coach for Iceland
Games of the Small States of Europe
Silver medal – second place	2009 Cyprus	Team

Jón Halldór Eðvaldsson (born 13 March 1975) is an Icelandic basketball coach and television personality. He has served as a basketball analyst for Körfuboltakvöld (English: Basketball Night) on Stöð 2 Sport.

== Early life ==
Before turning to coaching, Jón Halldór was a basketball referee and a football player for several years, playing the goalkeeper position. In 1999, he appeared in 17 matches for Víðir in the Icelandic second-tier 1. deild karla.

== Coaching career ==
In June 2006, Jón Halldór was hired as the head coach of Úrvalsdeild kvenna club Keflavík. He led the team to the national championship in 2008 and the Icelandic Company Cup in 2007, 2008 and 2010. In 2011 he led Keflavík to both the Icelandic Cup and the national championship. After the finals, Jón Halldór announced that he would step down as head coach. After the season he was named the Úrvalsdeild coach of the year.

In May 2013, Jón Halldór was hired as the head coach of Grindavík. In February 2014, with Grindavík in second-to-last place in the Úrvalsdeild kvenna, Jón Halldór stepped down as head coach.

On 8 May 2019, Jón Halldór was announced as new head coach to the Keflavík women's team. Keflavík opened the 2019–20 season with a 105-81 loss against reigning champions Valur in the annual Icelandic Super Cup.

In January 2025, he was hired as an assistant coach to Sigurður Ingimundarson with Keflavík women´s team.
