= Einar Bollason =

Icelandic basketball player, coach, and analyst

3rd Chairman of KKÍ
- In office 1973–1976
- Preceded by: Hólmsteinn Sigurðsson
- Succeeded by: Páll Júlíusson

Personal details
- Born: 6 November 1943 (age 83) Reykjavík, Kingdom of Iceland
- Spouse: Sigrún Ingólfsdóttir
- Children: 5
- Basketball career

Personal information
- Listed height: 196 cm (6 ft 5 in)

Career information
- Playing career: 1958–1984
- Position: Center
- Coaching career: 1966–1989

Career history

Playing
- 1958–1960: ÍR
- 1961–1967: KR
- 1967–1969: Þór Akureyri
- 1969–1972: KR
- 1976–1981: KR
- 1981–1982: FH
- 1983–1984: Haukar

Coaching
- 1966–1967: KR MT
- 1967–1969: Þór Akureyri MT
- 1968–1969: Þór Akureyri WT
- 1973–1974: KR
- 1974–1976: Iceland MNT
- 1977: Iceland MNT
- 1979–1982: Iceland MNT
- 1979–1980: Fram MT
- 1982–1986: Haukar MT
- 1984–1987: Iceland MNT
- 1986–1988: ÍR MT
- 1988–1989: Haukar MT

Career highlights
- As player: Icelandic Team of the 20th century; 6x Icelandic champion (1960, 1965–1967, 1978, 1979); 6× Icelandic Basketball Cup (1970–1972, 1974, 1977, 1979); Úrvalsdeild scoring champion (1969); As coach: Icelandic Coach of the 20th century; 2x Icelandic champion (Men's) (1967, 1974); 3× Icelandic Men's Basketball Cup (1977, 1985, 1986); 2x Icelandic champion (Women's) (1969, 1977); Icelandic Women's Basketball Cup (1977); 2x Men's Division I champion (1983, 1987)

Career Úrvalsdeild karla statistics
- Points: 2,914 (17.9 ppg)
- Games: 163

Einar Gunnar Bollason (born 6 November 1943) is an Icelandic former basketball player, coach and TV analyst. As a player, he won the Icelandic championship six times with KR. In 2001, he was named to the Icelandic basketball team of the 20th century and the coach of the 20th century by the Icelandic Basketball Association. In 2020, he received the Knight's Cross of the Order of the Falcon from the president of Iceland.

== Early life ==
Einar was born in Vesturbær in Reykjavík.

== Playing career ==
=== Club career ===
Einar came up through the junior ranks of ÍR and played his first senior games at the age of 15. He later moved to KR where he spent the bulk of his career.

=== Icelandic national team ===
Between 1964 and 1978, Einar played 35 games for the Icelandic national basketball team.

== Coaching career ==
Einar coached the men's national team in 1974–1976, 1977, 1979–1982 and 1984–1987. During his tenures the team played 133 games, winning 57.

== Team of the 20th century ==
In 2001 Einar was voted to the Icelandic team of the 20th century in basketball, both as a player and a coach.

== Icelandic Basketball Association ==
Einar served as the chairman of the Icelandic Basketball Association from 1973 to 1976.

== Career statistics in Icelandic top league ==
Legend
GP	Games played	FGM	Field goals made
FM	Free-throws made	FT	Free-throws taken
FT%	Free-throw percentage	TP	Total Points
PPG	Points per game	**Bold**	Career high

†	Denotes seasons in which Einar won the Icelandic National championship
	Led the league

Year	Team	GP	FGM	FM	FT	FT%	TP	PPG
1961-62	KR	5	N/A	N/A	N/A	N/A	84	16,8
1962-63	KR	8	N/A	N/A	N/A	N/A	139	17.4
1963-64	KR	3	N/A	N/A	N/A	N/A	63	20.7
1964-65†	KR	8	70	30	52	57.7%	170	21.3
1965-66†	KR	8	N/A	N/A	N/A	N/A	210	26.3
1966-67†	KR	10	N/A	N/A	N/A	N/A	207	20.7
1967-68	Þór	10	N/A	N/A	N/A	N/A	192	19.2
1968-69	Þór	10	N/A	97	124	78.3%	**318**	**31.8**
1969-70	KR	10	74	85	194	81.7%	233	23.3
1970-71	KR	12	N/A	N/A	N/A	N/A	292	24.3
1971-72	KR	14	133	38	49	77,6%	304	21.7
1976-77	KR	12	106	91	122	74.6%	303	25.3
1977-78†	KR	13	83	44	62	71.0%	210	16.2
1978-79†	KR	20	95	50	68	73.5%	240	12.0
1979-80	KR	1	1	0	0	N/A	2	2.0
1980-81	KR	5	3	0	0	N/A	6	1.2
1983-84	Haukar	14	10	6	13	46.2%	26	1.9
Career		163	N/A	N/A	N/A	N/A	2914	17.9

== Guðmundur and Geirfinnur case ==
In 1976, Einar, along with three others, sat innocent for 105 days in solitary confinement after his sister and other suspects in the Guðmundur and Geirfinnur case (Icelandic: Guðmundar- og Geirfinnsmálið) had implicated them to the case. He had been accused falsely by his step-sister, Erla Bolladóttir of having been involved in the case during her confessions. Erla was later sentenced to jail for perjury, as part of the Reykjavik Six, while Einar was released.

== Personal life ==
Einar is married to Sigrún Ingólfsdóttir and together they have five children. In 1982, he founded Íshestar, a horse travel agency. He sold the company in 2012 to Fannar Ólafsson and other investers.
