= Valur Orri Valsson =

Icelandic basketball player

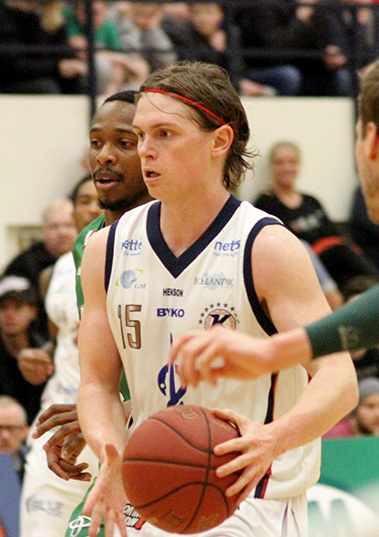
- Valur Orri in 2015.

Grindavík
- Position: Point guard

Personal information
- Born: 15 June 1994 (age 32)
- Listed height: 182 cm (6 ft 0 in)
- Listed weight: 84 kg (185 lb)

Career information
- College: Florida Tech (2016–2020)
- Playing career: 2009–present

Career history
- 2009–2010: Njarðvík
- 2010–2011: FSu
- 2011–2016: Keflavík
- 2020–2023: Keflavík
- 2023–2025: Grindavík
- 2025–2026: Keflavík
- 2026–present: Grindavík

Career highlights
- Icelandic League champion (2026); Icelandic Cup (2012); Icelandic Company Cup (2013)

Valur Orri Valsson (born 15 June 1994) is an Icelandic basketball player.

== Playing career ==
Playing the point guard position, Valur started is senior team career in 2009 at the age of 14 with Njarðvík before moving to FSu and later Keflavík. During the 2015–16 regular season, he posted career highs of 12.9 points and 5.5 assists per game, good for fourth best in the league.

He played college basketball for Florida Tech from 2016 to 2020. Despite having to sit out his first season with the team due to his age, he became the schools all-time leader in assists in 2020. After his college career ended, he announced he would return to Iceland to finish the 2019–20 season with Keflavík.

In May 2023, Valur Orri signed with Grindavík.

In 2025, Valur Orri joined Keflavík. In January 2026, he left Keflavík and joined Grindavík again. On 18 May 2026, he won his first national championship after Grindavík defeated Tindastóll in the Úrvalsdeild finals, 3–1.

== Personal life ==
Valur Orri is the son of Valur Ingimundarson, the Úrvalsdeild karla all-time leading scorer.
