= Anna María Sveinsdóttir =

Icelandic basketball player and coach (born 1969)

Personal information
- Born: 22 November 1969 (age 56) Keflavík, Iceland

Career information
- Playing career: 1984–2006
- Position: Power forward / center
- Number: 14
- Coaching career: 1997–2003

Career history

Playing
- 1984–1990: Keflavík
- 1990: Brunell
- 1990–2000: Keflavík
- 2001–2006: Keflavík

Coaching
- 1997–1999: Keflavík
- 2001–2003: Keflavík

Career highlights
- As player: Icelandic Player of the 20th century; Icelandic Team of the 20th century; Icelandic Basketball Player of the Year (1994); Icelandic Women's Basketball Player of the Year (1998); 6x Úrvalsdeild Domestic Player of the Year (1988, 1989, 1992, 1995, 1996, 1998, 1999); 10x Úrvalsdeild Domestic All-First Team (1988-1992, 1995-1999); 12x Icelandic champion (1988-1990, 1992-1994, 1996, 1998, 2000, 2003-2005); Icelandic Division I (1985); 10× Icelandic Basketball Cup (1988-1990, 1994-1998, 2000, 2004); 5x Icelandic Supercup (1996, 2001, 2003-2005); 3x Icelandic Company Cup (2002-2004); 4x Úrvalsdeild scoring champion (1988, 1990, 1991, 1998); Úrvalsdeild assists leader (2000); 2× Icelandic All-Star (2004, 2005); As coach: 2x Icelandic champion (1998, 2003); Icelandic Basketball Cup (1998); 2x Icelandic Supercup (2001, 2003); Icelandic Company Cup (2002)

Career Úrvalsdeild kvenna playing statistics
- Points: 5,001 (15.4 ppg)
- Games: 324

Career coaching record
- Úrvalsdeild kvenna: 56–20 (.737)
Medals
Women's basketball
Representing Iceland
Games of the Small States of Europe
Bronze medal – third place	2003 Malta	Team
Silver medal – second place	2005 Andorra	Team
FIBA European Championship for Small Countries
Gold medal – first place	1996 Malta	National Team
Silver medal – second place	2002 Andorra	National Team
Gold medal – first place	2004 Wales	National Team

Anna María Sveinsdóttir (born 22 November 1969) is an Icelandic former basketball player and coach. She won twelve Icelandic championships and eleven Icelandic basketball cups, and is regarded as one of the best women's players in Icelandic basketball history.

She was the first player to break the 5000 points barrier in Úrvalsdeild kvenna and finished her career as its all-time leading scorer with 5001 points in 324 games. The scoring record stood until 23 April 2013, when it was broken by Birna Valgarðsdóttir. In 2001 she was voted the Icelandic female basketball player of the century and as one of the twelve players on the team of the 20th century.

== Coaching career ==
Anna María served as a player-coach for four seasons with Keflavík, accumulating a 56-20 record (73.7%) and two national championships.

== National team career ==
Between 1986 and 2004, Anna María played 60 games for the Icelandic national basketball team.

== Úrvalsdeild statistics ==
†	Denotes seasons in which Anna María won the national championship
*	Led the league

=== Regular season statistics ===
Year	Team	GP	MPG	2P%	3P%	FT%	RPG	APG	SPG	BPG	PPG
1985–86	Keflavík	10	-	-	-	-	-	-	-	-	8.9
1986–87	Keflavík	18	-	-	-	.629	-	-	-	-	13.9
1987–88†	Keflavík	18	-	-	-	.735	-	-	-	-	17.5*
1988–89†	Keflavík	17	-	-	-	.576	-	-	-	-	16.3
1989–90†	Keflavík	18	-	-	-	.733	-	-	-	-	22.2*
1990–91	Keflavík	13	-	-	-	.744	-	-	-	-	24.0*
1991–92†	Keflavík	20	-	-	-	.808	-	-	-	-	18.2
1992–93†	Keflavík	7	-	-	-	.579	-	-	-	-	14.1
1993–94†	Keflavík	17	-	-	-	.742	-	-	-	-	16.4
1994–95	Keflavík	23	-	.479	.500	.890*	10.2	1.8	3.0	1.2	18.7
1995–96†	Keflavík	17	-	.534	.444	.792	9.6	1.8	2.6	0.6	20.2
1996–97	Keflavík	18	-	.481	.357	.765	8.4	2.4	3.7	0.6	16.9
1997–98†	Keflavík	16	28.5	.653	.333	.868	8.3	2.9	3.0	0.3	15.1*
1998–99	Keflavík	20	29.5	.361	.200	.903*	9.6	3.4	4.2	0.4	12.8
1999–00†	Keflavík	20	29.5	.472	.167	.864	9.3	4.9*	2.5	1.4	12.6
2001–02	Keflavík	9	24.6	.420	.333	.759	11.0	3.4	1.7	1.1	11.0
2002–03†	Keflavík	18	21.0	.418	.455	.750	6.8	3.4	2.3	0.8	9.3
2003–04†	Keflavík	19	25.9	.448	.414	.855	9.7	4.2	2.1	0.9	12.5
2004–05†	Keflavík	19	28.2	.439	.354	.872	8.1	3.5	2.9	1.1	12.1
2005–06	Keflavík	7	23.1	.423	.143	.625	5.4	2.9	3.1	0.7	8.1
Career		324	-	-	-	-	-	-	-	-	15.4

=== Playoffs statistics ===
Year	Team	GP	MPG	2P%	3P%	FT%	RPG	APG	SPG	BPG	TP	PPG
1994†	Keflavík	7	-	-	-	-	-	-	-	-	121	17.3
1995	Keflavík	5	-	.526	.000	.714	10.4	1.4	3.2	0.6	95	19.0
1996†	Keflavík	6	-	.458	.444	.909	9.7	2.8	3.7	0.3	110	18.3
1997	Keflavík	2	-	.414	.000	.833	5.0	1.0	4.0	0.5	34	17.0
1998†	Keflavík	6	-	.412	.429	.714	7.0	2.0	2.0	0.7	84	14.0
1999	Keflavík	5	35.6	.400	.21	.696	10.6	4.0	3.2	0.8	76	15.2
2000†	Keflavík	7	36.7	.449	.500	.765	8.1	4.6	3.6	1.7	106	15.1
2002	Keflavík	3	31.7	.500	.000	.750	9.3	3.0	2.3	1.0	17	5.7
2003†	Keflavík	5	26.2	.462	.182	1.000	8.8	5.6	2.8	0.6	65	13.0
2004†	Keflavík	6	32.3	.386	.600	.909	13.2	4.7	2.7	0.7	82	13.7
2005†	Keflavík	6	34.2	.391	.474	.813	11.5	3.5	3.7	1.2	76	12.7
Career		58	-	-	-	-	-	-	-	-	866	14.9

Note: Rebounds, assists, steals and blocks where first tracked during the 1993–94 season. Minutes where first tracked during the 1996–97 season.

== See also ==
- Icelandic Basketball Association
