= Signý Hermannsdóttir =

Icelandic basketball player (born 1979)

Personal information
- Born: 16 January 1979 (age 47)
- Listed height: 183 cm (6 ft 0 in)

Career information
- College: Cameron (1999–2003)
- Playing career: 1994–2013
- Position: Center
- Number: 4

Career history

Playing
- 1994–1996: Valur
- 1996–1999: ÍS
- 2003–2004: Isla de Tenerife
- 2004–2007: ÍS
- 2007–2009: Valur
- 2009–2011: KR
- 2011–2013: Valur

Coaching
- 2015–2016: Skallagrímur (assistant)

Career highlights
- As player: Icelandic Basketball Player of the Year (2003); 2× Úrvalsdeild Domestic Player of the Year (2009, 2010); 6× Úrvalsdeild Domestic All-First Team (1999, 2005, 2006, 2008–2010); Icelandic champion (2010); Icelandic Basketball Cup (2006); 2× Icelandic Supercup (1998, 2009, 2010); Úrvalsdeild all-time career rebounding leader; Úrvalsdeild all-time career blocks leader; As assistant coach: Icelandic D1 (2016)

Signý Hermannsdóttir (born 16 January 1979) is an Icelandic former basketball player. She was named the Icelandic Women's Basketball Player of the Year in 2003 and was a six-time selection to the Úrvalsdeild kvenna Domestic All-First Team. She won the Icelandic championship in 2010 with KR.

== Career ==
After graduating from Cameron University, Signý joined Spanish club Isla de Tenerife in 2003. She left the club in February 2004 due to unpaid salary and signed with ÍS.

In 2006, Signý helped ÍS advance to the Icelandic Basketball Cup finals, where she scored 23 points and grabbed 20 rebounds in the Cup clinching game. In 2009 she became the Úrvalsdeild kvenna all-time leader in rebounds and blocked shots. She was named the Úrvalsdeild kvenna Domestic Player of the Year that same year after averaging 19.1 points, 14.2 rebounds, 5.7 blocks and 3.8 assists per game for Valur.

In 2010, Signý led KR to the national championship and was again named the Domestic Player of the Year after averaging 12.8 points, 10.6 rebounds and 5.4 blocks per game.

After retiring in 2013, Signý served as an assistant coach to Skallagrímur during the 2015-2016 season. She headed the team for one game, a victory over KR, when head coach Manuel A. Rodríguez served a one-game suspension.

== Cameron statistics ==
Legend
| GP | Games played | GS | Games started | MPG | Minutes per game |
| FG% | Field goal percentage | 3P% | 3-point field goal percentage | FT% | Free throw percentage |
| RPG | Rebounds per game | APG | Assists per game | SPG | Steals per game |
| BPG | Blocks per game | PPG | Points per game | **Bold** | Career high |

| Year | Team | GP | Points | FG% | 3P% | FT% | RPG | APG | SPG | BPG | PPG |
|---|---|---|---|---|---|---|---|---|---|---|---|
| 1999-00 | Cameron | 15 | 169 | 41.9% | **41.9%** | 59.0% | **8.5** | 0.9 | 0.9 | 0.9 | 11.3 |
| 2000-01 | Cameron | 27 | **357** | **54.3%** | 41.7% | 66.7% | 7.2 | **1.8** | **1.1** | 1.8 | **13.2** |
| 2001-02 | Cameron | **30** | 355 | 48.5% | 30.4% | 63.5% | 6.7 | 1.5 | 1.0 | **2.2** | 11.8 |
| 2002-03 | Cameron | 26 | 292 | 41.2% | 35.7% | **75.3%** | 6.0 | 1.2 | 1.0 | 1.3 | 11.2 |
| Career | | 98 | 1173 | 47.2% | 149.8% | 13.9% | 2.1 | 1.4 | 1.0 | 1.7 | 12.0 |

== Icelandic national team ==
Signý played 61 games for the Icelandic national basketball team between 1999 and 2009, starting 56 of them.

== Awards, titles and accomplishments ==
=== Individual awards ===
- Icelandic Women's Basketball Player of the Year: 2003
- Úrvalsdeild Domestic All-First Team (6): 1999, 2005, 2006, 2008, 2009, 2010

=== Titles ===
- Icelandic champion: 2010
- Icelandic Basketball Cup: 2006
- Icelandic Supercup (3): 1998, 2009, 2010
- Icelandic Company Cup: 2009

=== Accomplishments ===
- **Úrvalsdeild all-time career rebounding leader**
- **Úrvalsdeild all-time career blocks leader**
- Úrvalsdeild rebounding leader (3): 1998, 1999, 2005
- Úrvalsdeild blocks leader (6): 1996, 1998, 2005, 2008, 2009, 2010
- Icelandic All-Star game: 2005, 2006, 2008, 2010, 2011
