= 1999–2000 Úrvalsdeild kvenna (basketball) =

Úrvalsdeild kvenna
- Duration: October 2, 1999 – April 10, 2000
- Teams: 6

Regular season
- Top seed: KR
- Relegated: None

Finals
- Champions: Keflavík (9th title)
- Runners-up: KR
- Semi-finalists: ÍS, Tindastóll

Awards
- Domestic MVP: (Iceland) Erla Þorsteinsdóttir
- Foreign MVP: (United States) Ebony Dickinson

Statistical leaders
Points	(United States) Ebony Dickinson	32.2
Rebounds	(United States) Ebony Dickinson	18.7
Assists	(Iceland) Alda Leif Jónsdóttir (Iceland) Anna María Sveinsdóttir (Iceland) Kristín Blöndal	4.9

The 1999–2000 Úrvalsdeild kvenna was the 42nd season of the Úrvalsdeild kvenna, the top tier women's basketball league in Iceland. The season started on October 2, 1999, and ended on April 10, 2000. Keflavík won its ninth title by defeating KR 3–2 in the Finals.

== Competition format ==
The participating teams first played a conventional round-robin schedule with every team playing each opponent twice "home" and twice "away" for a total of 20 games. The top four teams qualified for the championship playoffs while none were relegated to Division I due to vacant berths.

== Regular season ==
Pos	Team	Pld	W	L	PF	PA	PD	Pts	Qualification or relegation
1	KR	20	18	2	1510	904	+606	36	Qualification to playoffs
2	Keflavík	20	18	2	1489	1038	+451	36	Qualification to playoffs
3	ÍS	20	11	9	1152	1117	+35	22	Qualification to playoffs
4	Tindastóll	20	6	14	1147	1417	−270	12	Qualification to playoffs, disbanded after the season
5	KFÍ	20	5	15	1155	1454	−299	10	
6	Grindavík	20	2	18	877	1400	−523	4	Spared from relegation due to vacance berths

Source: Úrvalsdeild kvenna 1999–2000

== Playoffs ==
Semifinals
1	KR	2
4	Tindastóll	0
2	Keflavík	2
3	ÍS	0

Finals
1	KR	2
2	Keflavík	3

Source: 2000 Úrvalsdeild kvenna playoffs
