= Guðbjörg Norðfjörð =

Icelandic basketball player (born 1972)

15th Chairman of KKÍ
- In office 2023–2025
- Deputy: Birna Lárusdóttir
- Preceded by: Hannes S. Jónsson
- Succeeded by: Kristinn Albertsson

Personal details
- Born: 8 April 1972 (age 54)
- Basketball career

Career information
- Playing career: 1986–2002
- Position: Forward
- Number: 7, 14

Career history
- 1986–1992: Haukar
- 1992–2001: KR
- 2001: Haukar
- 2001–2002: KR

Career highlights
- As player: Icelandic Women's Basketball Player of the Year (1999); Úrvalsdeild Domestic Player of the Year (1997); 7x Úrvalsdeild Domestic All-First Team (1993, 1994, 1996–2000); 3x Icelandic champion (1999, 2001, 2002); 4x Icelandic Basketball Cup (1992, 1999, 2001, 2002); 2x Icelandic Supercup (1999); Icelandic Company Cup (2000); Úrvalsdeild scoring leader (1999)

Career Úrvalsdeild kvenna statistics
- Points: 3,122 (11.8 ppg)
- Games: 264
Medals
Women's basketball
Representing Iceland
Promotion Cup
Gold medal – first place	1996 Malta	National Team
Silver medal – second place	2002 Andorra	National Team
Games of the Small States of Europe
Bronze medal – third place	1991 Andorra	National Team
Silver medal – second place	1993 Malta	National Team
Silver medal – second place	1995 Luxembourg	National Team
Gold medal – first place	1997 Iceland	National Team

Guðbjörg Norðfjörð Elíasdóttir (born 8 April 1972) is an Icelandic former basketball player and the former chairman of the Icelandic Basketball Federation. As a player, she was named the Icelandic Women's Basketball Player of the Year in 1999 and was a seven-time selection to the Úrvalsdeild kvenna Domestic All-First Team. Guðbjörg won the Icelandic championship three times and the Icelandic Cup four times. She was a member of the Icelandic national basketball team from 1990 to 2002.

In 2001, Guðbjörg was voted as one of the twelve players on the Icelandic team of the 20th century.

== Playing career ==
=== Club career ===
Guðbjörg started her career with Haukar where she won the Icelandic Cup in 1992. Despite being reigning cup champions, lack of funds and interest from the Haukar basketball department resulted in the team folding before the start of the 1992–93 season, forcing Guðbjörg to transfer to KR.

In 1999, she helped KR go undefeated through the league and cup, winning both the national championship and the Icelandic Cup.

Guðbjörg missed the majority of the 2000–2001 season after the birth of her first child. She returned before the end of the season, averaging 6.8 points in 4 regular season games. In the playoffs, she helped KR go undefeated, sweeping ÍS in the semi-finals and Keflavík in the finals.

In September 2001, Guðbjörg announced that she would not play with KR during the season and a few days later she signed with her hometown team Haukar in the second-tier 2. deild kvenna. On 5 November, in her first official game back with Haukar, Guðbjörg scored 26 points in a victory against Laugdælir. On 11 November, she had 23 points and 11 rebounds in a loss against Keflavík in the Company Cup. That turned out to be her last game with Haukar as a few days later she transferred back to KR. Without Guðbjörg, KR had stumbled out of the gates, losing 4 out of its first 9 games. With her, the team finished with 9 victories in its last 11 games, good for second place in the league. For the season she averaged a team leading 16.6 points per game while shooting 40.6% from three point range and league leading 93.6% from free throws. In the playoffs, Guðbjörg helped KR overcome a 0-2 deficit against ÍS in the Úrvalsdeild finals to win the national championship for the second year in a row.

After playing for the national team during the summer, Guðbjörg retired from basketball in August 2002. Over her Úrvalsdeild career, Guðbjörg scored 3,122 points in 264 games.

=== National team career ===
Guðbjörg played 53 games for the Icelandic national basketball team between 1990 and 2002. She retired following the 2002 European Promotion Cup.

== Icelandic Basketball Federation ==
Guðbjörg was elected as the vice-chairman of the Icelandic Basketball Federation in 2006, where she served until 2007, and again in 2009. In March 2023, she took over as chairman after Hannes S. Jónsson stepped down. In January 2025, she announced that she would not seek re-election in 2025.

== Awards, titles and accomplishments ==
=== Individual awards ===
- Icelandic basketball team of the 20th century: 2000
- Icelandic Women's Basketball Player of the Year: 1999
- Úrvalsdeild Domestic Player of the Year: 1997
- Úrvalsdeild Domestic All-First Team (7): 1993, 1994, 1996, 1997, 1998, 1999, 2000

=== Titles ===
- Icelandic champion (3): 1999, 2001, 2002
- Icelandic Basketball Cup (4): 1992, 1999, 2001, 2002
- Icelandic Supercup: 1999
- Icelandic Company Cup: 2000

=== Accomplishments ===
- Úrvalsdeild scoring leader: 1999
- Úrvalsdeild three-point percent leader (2): 1997, 1999
- Úrvalsdeild free throw percent leader: 2002
