= Alda Leif Jónsdóttir =

Icelandic basketball player

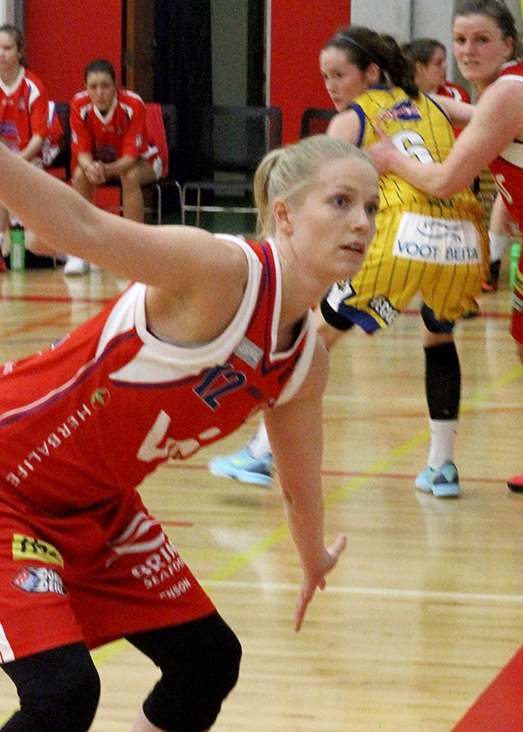
- Alda Leif in 2014.

Personal information
- Born: 18 April 1979 (age 47)
- Listed height: 173 cm (5 ft 8 in)

Career information
- Playing career: 1994–2008; 2010–2018
- Position: Shooting guard
- Number: 12

Career history
- 1994–1996: Valur
- 1996–1999: ÍS
- 1999–2000: Keflavík
- 2000–2001: Holbæk
- 2001–2005: ÍS
- 2005–2006: Den Helder
- 2006–2007: ÍS
- 2007–2008: Snæfell
- 2010–2018: Snæfell

Career highlights
- Icelandic Team of the 20th century; Úrvalsdeild Domestic Player of the Year (2002); 7× Úrvalsdeild Domestic All-First Team (1997–2000, 2002, 2004, 2005); 4× Icelandic champion (2000, 2014–2016); Dutch champion (2006); Dutch All-Star game (2006); 3× Icelandic All-Star (2004, 2005, 2013); Icelandic Supercup (2012); 3× Icelandic Basketball Cup (2000, 2003, 2016); Úrvalsdeild scoring champion (2002); 5× Úrvalsdeild assists leader (1998–2000, 2002, 2004); 5× Úrvalsdeild blocks leader (1999, 2000, 2002–2004); Úrvalsdeild steals leader (2000)

Career Úrvalsdeild kvenna statistics
- Points: 3,223 (9.6 ppg)
- Rebounds: 1,482 (4.5 rpg)
- Assists: 1,071 (3.2 rpg)
Medals
Women's basketball
Representing Iceland
Games of the Small States of Europe
Bronze medal – third place	2003 Malta	Team
Silver medal – second place	2005 Andorra	Team
FIBA European Championship for Small Countries
Gold medal – first place	1996 Malta	National Team
Gold medal – first place	2004 Wales	National Team

Alda Leif Jónsdóttir (born 18 April 1979) is an Icelandic former basketball player. She has won the Icelandic championship four times and the Dutch championship once. Alda was a seven-time selection for the Úrvalsdeild Domestic All-First Team and was named the Úrvalsdeild Domestic Player of the Year in 2002.

== Club career ==
During the 1999–2000 season, Alda led the Úrvalsdeild in assists, blocks, steals, shooting percent and free throw percent. She spent the following season with Holbæk in the Dameligaen, averaging 11 points, 6 rebounds, 4 assists and 3,5 steals per game.

In 2005, Alda signed with BV Den Helder (women) of the Dutch Women's Basketball League (WBL). She was named to the 2006 Dutch All-Star game and helped Den Helder to the Dutch championship.

After missing most of the 2013–14 season due to surgery on both knees, Alda helped Snæfell win the national championship for the first time in 2014. She helped the team to the championship again in 2015 and 2016.

== National team career ==
Between 1996 and 2005, Alda played 52 games for the Icelandic national basketball team.

== Team of the 20th century ==
In 2001 Alda was voted as one of the twelve players on the Icelandic team of the 20th century.

== Personal life ==
Alda is the daughter of Kolbrún Leifsdóttir who was named one of the top 12 Icelandic basketball players of the 20th century.

== Awards, titles and accomplishments ==
=== Individual awards ===
==== Iceland ====
- Icelandic Team of the 20th century
- Úrvalsdeild Domestic Player of the Year: 2002
- Úrvalsdeild Domestic All-First Team (7): 1997–2000, 2002, 2004, 2005

=== Titles ===
==== Holland ====
- Dutch champion: 2006

==== Iceland ====
- Úrvalsdeild (4): 2000, 2014, 2015, 2016
- Icelandic Basketball Cup (3): 2000, 2003, 2016
- Icelandic Super Cup: 2012
- Icelandic Company Cup (2): 1998, 2012
- 1. deild kvenna: 2008

=== Accomplishments ===
==== Holland ====
- Dutch All-Star game: 2006

==== Iceland ====
- Icelandic All-Star game: 2005, 2013
- Úrvalsdeild scoring champion: 2002
- Úrvalsdeild assists leader (5): 1998, 1999, 2000, 2002, 2004
- Úrvalsdeild blocks leader (5): 1999, 2000, 2002, 2003, 2004
- Úrvalsdeild steals leader: 2000
