= Birna Valgarðsdóttir =

Icelandic basketball player (born 1976)

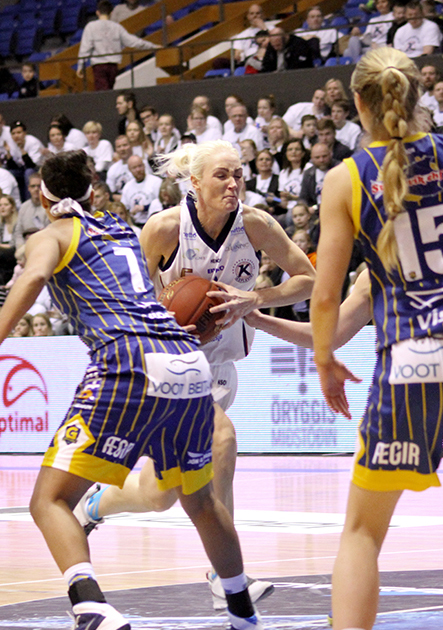
- Birna with Keflavík in February 2015.

Personal information
- Born: 19 January 1976 (age 50) Sauðárkrókur, Iceland
- Listed height: 181 cm (5 ft 11 in)

Career information
- Playing career: 1992–2015
- Position: Small forward
- Number: 5

Career history
- 1992–1994: Tindastóll
- 1994–1996: Breiðablik
- 1996–1997: Keflavík
- 1997–1998: Grindavík
- 1998–2015: Keflavík

Career highlights
- 2× Icelandic Female Basketball Player of the Year (2002, 2004); 9× Úrvalsdeild Domestic All-First Team (1997, 2002–2006, 2009–2011); 8× Icelandic champion (1995, 2000, 2003–2005, 2008, 2011, 2013); 5× Icelandic Cup (1997, 2000, 2004, 2011, 2013); 10× Icelandic Super Cup (1995, 1996, 2000, 2001, 2003-2005, 2007, 2008, 2013); Icelandic Cup Finals MVP (2011); Úrvalsdeild kvenna all-time career scoring leader

Career Úrvalsdeild kvenna statistics
- Points: 5,325 (14.2 ppg)
- Games: 375
Medals
Women's basketball
Representing Iceland
Games of the Small States of Europe
Bronze medal – third place	2003 Malta	Team
Silver medal – second place	2005 Andorra	Team
FIBA European Championship for Small Countries
Gold medal – first place	1996 Malta	National Team
Silver medal – second place	2002 Andorra	National Team
Gold medal – first place	2004 Wales	National Team

Birna Ingibjörg Valgarðsdóttir (born 19 January 1976) is an Icelandic former basketball player who won eight Icelandic championships, in a record twelve trips to the national finals, and five Icelandic Cups. She was named the Icelandic Female Basketball Player of the Year in 2002 and 2004.

Birna was the second player to break the 5000 points barrier in Úrvalsdeild kvenna and is its all-time leading scorer. In December 2014, she broke the Úrvalsdeild kvenna all-time record for games played and held that record until March 2023, when it was broken by Sigrún Sjöfn Ámundadóttir.

After difficult injuries during the later part of her career, Birna retired following the 2014-2015 season.

== Icelandic national team ==
Between 1995 and 2009, Birna played 76 games for the Icelandic national basketball team.

== Awards and honours ==
- 2x Icelandic Basketball Player of the Year (2002, 2004)
- 9x Úrvalsdeild Domestic All-First Team (1997, 2002–2006, 2009–2011)
- 8x Icelandic league champion (1995, 2000, 2003–2005, 2008, 2011, 2013)
- 5× Icelandic Basketball Cup (1997, 2000, 2004, 2011, 2013)
- 10x Icelandic Supercup (1995, 1996, 2000, 2001, 2003-2005, 2007, 2008, 2013)
- 7x Icelandic Company Cup (2002–2004, 2007, 2008, 2010, 2014)
- Úrvalsdeild kvenna all-time career scoring leader
