= Keflavík (women's basketball) =

Icelandic basketball team

Keflavík ÍF
- Nickname: Keflavíkurhraðlestin (The Keflavík Express); Litlu slátrararnir (The little butchers)
- Leagues: Úrvalsdeild kvenna
- Founded: 1974
- History: ÍBK; 1974–1994; Keflavík; 1994–present
- Arena: TM Arena (capacity: 1,200)
- Location: Reykjanesbær, Iceland
- Team colors: Dark blue and White
- Championships: 17 Icelandic championships
- Website: keflavik.is
Home	Away

The Keflavík women's basketball team, commonly known as Keflavík, is the women's basketball department of Keflavík ÍF (Keflavík, íþrótta- og ungmennafélag), based in the town of Reykjanesbær in Iceland. It is Iceland's most successful women's basketball team with 17 national championship. They currently play in Úrvalsdeild kvenna where they won the national championship in 2017. The club has won the Icelandic Basketball Cup a record 17 times.

== Arena ==
Keflavík plays its home games at the TM Arena, commonly nicknamed "The Slaughterhouse".

== Trophies and awards ==
=== Trophies ===
- Icelandic champions: (17):
  - 1988–1990, 1992–1994, 1996, 1998, 2000, 2003–2005, 2008, 2011, 2013, 2017, 2024
- Icelandic Basketball Cup: (17):
  - 1988–1990, 1993–1998, 2000, 2004, 2011, 2013, 2017, 2018, 2024, 2026
- Icelandic Basketball Supercup: (11):
  - 1996, 2000, 2001, 2003–2005, 2007, 2008, 2013, 2017, 2018
- Icelandic Company Cup: (7):
  - 2002, 2003, 2004, 2007, 2008, 2010, 2014
- 1. deild kvenna:
  - 1985

=== Awards ===
Úrvalsdeild Women's Domestic Player of the Year

- Anna María Sveinsdóttir – 1988, 1989, 1995, 1996, 1998, 1999
- Björg Hafsteinsdóttir – 1990
- Erla Þorsteinsdóttir – 2000
- Pálína Gunnlaugsdóttir – 2008, 2012, 2013
- Olga Færseth – 1994
- Thelma Dís Ágústsdóttir – 2017

Úrvalsdeild Women's Foreign Player of the Year

- Ariana Moorer – 2017
- Brittanny Dinkins – 2019
- Daniela Wallen – 2021, 2023
- Jacquline Adamshick – 2011
- Jennifer Boucek – 1998
- Reshea Bristol – 2005
- TeKesha Watson – 2008

Úrvalsdeild Women's Domestic All-First Team

- Alda Leif Jónsdóttir – 2000
- Anna Ingunn Svansdóttir – 2023
- Anna María Sveinsdóttir – 1988, 1989, 1990, 1991, 1992, 1995, 1996, 1997, 1998, 1999
- Björg Hafsteinsdóttir – 1988, 1989, 1990, 1991, 1992, 1995
- Birna Valgarðsdóttir – 1997, 2002, 2003, 2004, 2005, 2006, 2009, 2010, 2011
- Birna Valgerður Benónýsdóttir – 2023
- Bryndís Guðmundsdóttir – 2005, 2007, 2011, 2013, 2014, 2015, 2019
- Erla Reynisdóttir – 1997, 1998
- Erla Þorsteinsdóttir – 1998, 2000, 2002, 2003, 2004
- Emelía Ósk Gunnarsdóttir – 2017
- Kristín Blöndal – 1993
- Olga Færseth – 1993, 1994
- Margrét Kara Sturludóttir – 2007
- María Ben Erlingsdóttir – 2006, 2007
- Marín Rós Karlsdóttir – 2001
- Pálína Gunnlaugsdóttir – 2008, 2011, 2012, 2013
- Sara Rún Hinriksdóttir – 2015,
- Thelma Dís Ágústsdóttir – 2017, 2018

Úrvalsdeild Women's Young Player of the Year

- Birna Valgerður Benónýsdóttir – 2017, 2019
- Bryndís Guðmundsdóttir – 2005
- Erla Reynisdóttir – 1995
- Margrét Kara Sturludóttir – 2007
- María Ben Erlingsdóttir – 2004, 2006
- Sara Rún Hinriksdóttir – 2013, 2016
- Thelma Dís Ágústsdóttir – 2017

Úrvalsdeild kvenna Coach of the Year

- Anna María Sveinsdóttir – 2002
- Jón Halldór Eðvaldsson – 2008, 2011
- Sigurður Ingimundarson – 2013
- Sverrir Þór Sverrisson – 2017

== Notable players ==
Criteria

To appear in this section a player must have either:

- Played at least three seasons for the club.
- Set a club record or won an individual award while at the club.
- Played at least one official international match for their national team at any time.
- Played at least one official WNBA match at any time.

- (Iceland) Alda Leif Jónsdóttir
- (Iceland) Anna María Sveinsdóttir
- (United States) Ariana Moorer
- (Iceland) Auður Rafnsdóttir
- (Iceland) Björg Hafsteinsdóttir
- (Iceland) Birna Valgarðsdóttir
- (Iceland) Birna Valgerður Benónýsdóttir
- (United States) Brittanny Dinkins
- (Iceland) Bríet Sif Hinriksdóttir
- (Iceland) Bryndís Guðmundsdóttir
- (Venezuela) Daniela Wallen
- (Iceland) Elínborg Herbertsdóttir
- (Iceland) Embla Kristínardóttir
- (Iceland) Emelía Ósk Gunnarsdóttir
- (Iceland) Erla Reynisdóttir
- (Iceland) Erla Þorsteinsdóttir
- (Iceland) Erna Hákonardóttir
- (Iceland) Guðlaug Sveinsdóttir
- (Iceland) Hallveig Jónsdóttir
- (Iceland) Hanna Björg Kjartansdóttir
- (Iceland) Ingibjörg Jakobsdóttir
- (Iceland) Ingibjörg Vilbergsdóttir
- (United States) Jacquline Adamshick
- (Iceland) Katla Rún Garðarsdóttir
- (United States) Jenny Boucek
- (Iceland) Kristín Blöndal
- (Iceland) Kristín Þórarinsdóttir
- (Croatia) Lisa Karčić
- (United States) Monica Wright
- (Iceland) Margrét Kara Sturludóttir
- (Iceland) Margrét Sturlaugsdóttir
- (Iceland) María Ben Erlingsdóttir
- (Iceland) Marín Laufey Davíðsdóttir
- (Iceland) Marín Rós Karlsdóttir
- (Iceland) Pálína Gunnlaugsdóttir
- (Iceland) Olga Færseth
- (Iceland) Rannveig Randversdóttir
- (United States) Reshea Bristol
- (Iceland) Salbjörg Ragna Sævarsdóttir
- (Iceland) Sandra Lind Þrastardóttir
- (Iceland) Sara Rún Hinriksdóttir
- (Iceland) Svava Ósk Stefánsdóttir
- (United States) TeKesha Watson
- (Iceland) Thelma Dís Ágústsdóttir
- (Romania) Tünde Kilin
- (Iceland) Þóranna Kika Hodge-Carr

== Coaches ==
- (Iceland) Guðbrandur Stefánsson 1985–1987
- (Iceland) Jón Kr. Gíslason 1987–1989
- (United States) John Veargason 1989
- (Iceland) Falur Harðarson 1989–1991
- (Iceland) Sigurður Ingimundarson 1991–1996
- (Iceland) Jón Guðmundsson 1996–1997
- (Iceland) Anna María Sveinsdóttir 1997–1999
- (Iceland) Kristinn Einarsson 1999–2001
- (Iceland) Kristinn Óskarsson 2001
- (Iceland) Anna María Sveinsdóttir 2001–2003
- (Iceland) Hjörtur Harðarson 2003–2004
- (Iceland) Sigurður Ingimundarson 2004
- (Iceland) Sverrir Þór Sverrisson 2004–2006
- (Iceland) Jón Halldór Eðvaldsson 2006–2011
- (Iceland) Falur Harðarson 2011–2012
- (Iceland) Sigurður Ingimundarson 2012–2013
- (United States) Andy Johnston 2013–2014
- (Iceland) Sigurður Ingimundarson 2014–2015
- (Iceland) Margrét Sturlaugsdóttir 2015–2016
- (Iceland) Sverrir Þór Sverrisson 2016–2018
- (Iceland) Jón Guðmundsson 2018–2019
- (Iceland) Jón Halldór Eðvaldsson 2019–2022
- (Iceland) Hörður Vilhjálmsson 2022–2023
- (Iceland) Sverrir Þór Sverrisson 2023–2024
- (Iceland) Friðrik Ingi Rúnarsson 2024
- (Iceland) Sigurður Ingimundarson 2025
- (Iceland) Hörður Vilhjálmsson 2025–2026
- (Iceland) Arnór Daði Jónsson 2026–present
