= Úrvalsdeild kvenna (basketball) =

- Founded: 1952
- First season: 1952
- Country: Iceland
- Confederation: FIBA Europe (Europe)
- Number of teams: 10
- Level on pyramid: 1
- Relegation to: 1. deild kvenna
- Domestic cup: Bikarkeppni KKÍ
- Supercup: Meistarakeppni kvenna
- Current champions: Njarðvík (3rd title)
- Most championships: Keflavík (17 titles)
- All-time top scorer: Birna Valgarðsdóttir
- TV partners: Stöð 2 Sport
- Website: KKÍ.is
- 2025–26 season

Úrvalsdeild kvenna (English: Women's Premier League), known as Bónus deild kvenna for sponsorship reasons, is the highest basketball competition among women's clubs in Iceland. It is administered by the Icelandic Basketball Federation. It was founded in 1952 and, until 2007, it was known as 1. deild kvenna (English: Women's First division).

The league was known as the Subway deild kvenna from 2021 to 2024. In July 2024, supermarket chain Bónus became the primary sponsor.

== Champions ==
Season	Champion	Score	Runner-up	Champion's coach
1953	Ármann	1-0 (Note: Ármann and ÍR were the only two teams registered for the 1953 competition.)	ÍR	
1954	Not played			
1955	Not played			
1956	ÍR			(Iceland) Hrefna Ingimarsdóttir
1957	ÍR			(Iceland) Hrefna Ingimarsdóttir
1958	ÍR			(Iceland) Hrefna Ingimarsdóttir
1959	Ármann			(Iceland) Ingvar Sigurbjörnsson and (Iceland) Birgir Örn Birgis
1960	Ármann			(Iceland) Ingvar Sigurbjörnsson and (Iceland) Birgir Örn Birgis
1961	KR			
1962	Not played			
1963	ÍR	1-0	Skallagrímur	
1964	Skallagrímur	League (Note: Skallagrímur defeated Björk and ÍR to clinch the championship.)	ÍR	(Iceland) Guðmundur Sigurðsson
1965	Not played			
1966	ÍR	28-18 (Note: Only ÍR an KR participated in the 1966 women's tournament. The teams played one game for the national championship, which ÍR won 28-18.)	KR	
1967	ÍR		KR	
1968	Not played			
1969	Þór Akureyri	1-0 (Note: Þór, which won the Norðurland's group, was slated to face KFÍ, which had won the Vesturland's group, in a game for the national championship. KFÍ could not field a team on the scheduled gameday due to bad weather.)	KFÍ	(Iceland) Einar Bollason
1970	ÍR	League		
1971	Þór Akureyri	League	ÍR	(Iceland) Guttormur Ólafsson
1971–72	ÍR	League		
1972–73	ÍR	League		
1973–74	ÍR	League		
1974–75	ÍR	League		(Iceland) Einar Ólafsson
1975–76	Þór Akureyri	League		(Iceland) Anton Sölvason
1976–77	KR	League		(Iceland) Einar Bollason
1977–78	ÍS	62-51 (Note: ÍS an KR where tied at the end of the season and had to play an extra game for the national championship. ÍS won the game 62-51.)	KR	(United States) Dirk Dunbar
1978–79	KR	League		(United States) John Hudson
1979–80	KR	League		
1980–81	KR	League	ÍS	(Iceland) Sigurður Hjörleifsson
1981–82	KR	League	ÍS	(United States) Stew Johnson
1982–83	KR	League	ÍS	(United States) Stew Johnson
1983–84	ÍS	League	ÍR	(Iceland) Guðný Eiríksdóttir
1984–85	KR	League	Haukar	(Iceland) Ingimar Jónsson
1985–86	KR	League	ÍS	(Iceland) Ágúst Líndal
1986–87	KR	League	Keflavík	(Iceland) Ágúst Líndal
1987–88	Keflavík	League	ÍS	(Iceland) Jón Kr. Gíslason
1988–89	Keflavík	League	ÍR	(Iceland) Jón Kr. Gíslason
1989–90	Keflavík	League	Haukar	(Iceland) Falur Harðarson
1990–91	ÍS (Note: ÍS, Haukar and Keflavík all finished with 11-4 record but ÍS had a better winning percent in games against the other two.)	League		(Iceland) Jóhann A. Bjarnason
1991–92	Keflavík	League	Haukar	(Iceland) Sigurður Ingimundarson
1992–93	Keflavík	3-0	KR	(Iceland) Sigurður Ingimundarson
1993–94	Keflavík	3-2	KR	(Iceland) Sigurður Ingimundarson
1994–95	Breiðablik	3-0	Keflavík	(Iceland) Sigurður Hjörleifsson
1995–96	Keflavík	3-1	KR	(Iceland) Sigurður Ingimundarson
1996–97	Grindavík	3-0	KR	(Iceland) Ellert Sigurður Magnússon
1997–98	Keflavík	3-1	KR	(Iceland) Anna María Sveinsdóttir
1998–99	KR	3-0	Keflavík	(Iceland) Óskar Kristjánsson
1999–2000	Keflavík	3-2	KR	(Iceland) Kristinn Einarsson
2000–01	KR	3-0	Keflavík	(Iceland) Henning Henningsson
2001–02	KR	3-2	ÍS	(Canada) Keith Vassell
2002–03	Keflavík	3-0	KR	(Iceland) Anna María Sveinsdóttir
2003–04	Keflavík	3-0	ÍS	(Iceland) Sigurður Ingimundarson
2004–05	Keflavík	3-0	Grindavík	(Iceland) Sverrir Þór Sverrisson
2005–06	Haukar	3-0	Keflavík	(Iceland) Ágúst Björgvinsson
2006–07	Haukar	3-1	Keflavík	(Iceland) Ágúst Björgvinsson
2007–08	Keflavík	3-0	KR	(Iceland) Jón Halldór Eðvaldsson
2008–09	Haukar	3-2	KR	(Iceland) Yngvi Gunnlaugsson
2009–10	KR	3-2	Hamar	(Iceland) Benedikt Guðmundsson
2010–11	Keflavík	3-0	Njarðvík	(Iceland) Jón Halldór Eðvaldsson
2011–12	Njarðvík	3-1	Haukar	(Iceland) Sverrir Þór Sverrisson
2012–13	Keflavík	3-1	KR	(Iceland) Sigurður Ingimundarson
2013–14	Snæfell	3-0	Haukar	(Iceland) Ingi Þór Steinþórsson
2014–15	Snæfell	3-0	Keflavík	(Iceland) Ingi Þór Steinþórsson
2015–16	Snæfell	3-2	Haukar	(Iceland) Ingi Þór Steinþórsson
2016–17	Keflavík	3-1	Snæfell	(Iceland) Sverrir Þór Sverrisson
2017–18	Haukar	3-2	Valur	(Iceland) Ingvar Þór Guðjónsson
2018–19	Valur	3-0	Keflavík	(Iceland) Darri Freyr Atlason
2019–20	Season canceled due to the COVID-19 outbreak			
2020–21	Valur	3-0	Haukar	(Iceland) Ólafur Jónas Sigurðsson
2021–22	Njarðvík	3-2	Haukar	(Iceland) Rúnar Ingi Erlingsson
2022–23	Valur	3-1	Keflavík	(Iceland) Ólafur Jónas Sigurðsson
2023–24	Keflavík	3-0	Njarðvík	(Iceland) Sverrir Þór Sverrisson
2024–25	Haukar	3-2	Njarðvík	(Iceland) Emil Barja
2025–26	Njarðvík	3-1	Haukar	(Iceland) Einar Árni Jóhannsson

== Titles per club ==
Titles	Club
17	Keflavík
14	KR
11	ÍR
5	Haukar
3	Ármann, ÍS, Njarðvík, Snæfell, Þór Akureyri, Valur
1	Breiðablik, Grindavík, Skallagrímur

== Awards and honors ==
=== Domestic All-First Team ===
The Women's Domestic All-First Team is an annual Úrvalsdeild honor bestowed on the best players in the league following every season.

=== Úrvalsdeild Women's Playoffs MVP ===
Úrvalsdeild Playoffs MVP award is awarded annually to the player judged most valuable to his team during the Úrvalsdeild playoffs.
