= Shanna-Lei Dacanay =

American basketball player

Personal information
- Born: 31 July 1987 (age 39)
- Listed height: 160 cm (5 ft 3 in)

Career information
- High school: Punahou (Honolulu, Hawaii)
- College: WashU (2005–2009)
- Position: Point guard

Career history
- 2015–2016: Haukar
- 2016–2017: Breiðablik
- 2017: Stjarnan
- 2020–2021: Haukar
- 2021–2022: ÍR
- 2022–2023: Fjölnir
- 2023–2024: Njarðvík

Career highlights
- UAA Rookie of the year (2006)

Shanna-Lei Caridad Dacanay (born 31 July 1987) is an American basketball player. She played college basketball for Washington University in St. Louis where she was the University Athletic Association Rookie of the year in 2006.

== Playing career ==
Dacanay played high school basketball for Punahou School in Honolulu, Hawaii. During her senior season she was named the Interscholastic League of Honolulu Player of the Year after averaging 11.6 points, 3.8 assists and 2.8 steals while shooting 41.7% from the three point line. She scored a season high 21 points in a 66–51 victory over Iolani that clinched Punahou's third straight ILH championship and also led the school to a state title victory over Konawaena in double overtime.

Following high school, Dacanay joined Washington University in St. Louis. After her freshman season she was named the University Athletic Association Rookie of the Year. She moved into the starting lineup in her sophomore season and was averaging 10.7 points and 2.8 assists in the first nine games when she suffered an Anterior cruciate ligament injury that ended her season. She returned to form in her junior season, leading the division with a 2.83 assist-to-turnover ratio. During her senior season, she helped the Bears to the Division III final where they lost to George Fox 53–60. She finished her career third in Bears history with 317 career assists.

In 2015, Dacanay joined Haukar of the Icelandic Úrvalsdeild kvenna. She was a key player for Haukar's comeback in the semi-finals of the playoffs against Grindavík where the Hafnarfjörður team won three games in a row after losing the first two games of the series and advanced to the Úrvalsdeild finals. In the finals, Haukar lost to Snæfell in five games. She started the 2016–2017 season with 1. deild kvenna club Breiðablik before returning to the Úrvalsdeild in February with Stjarnan. Backing up Danielle Rodriguez, she helped Stjarnan reach the Úrvalsdeild playoffs for the first time in its history but the team was swept 3–0 by Snæfell in the first round.

Dacanay returned to Haukar for the 2021 season and helped the team to the Úrvalsdeild finals where it lost to Valur in three games.

In October 2021, Dacanay signed with 1. deild kvenna club ÍR. She helped ÍR achieve promotion to the Úrvalsdeild, averaging 14 points, 3 rebounds and 2 assists in the finals of the promotion playoffs against Ármann.

In June 2022, Dacanay signed with Úrvalsdeild kvenna club Fjölnir following her former ÍR coach Kristjana Eir Jónsdóttir.

In 2023, Dacany signed with Njarðvík.

=== College statistics ===
Legend
GP	Games played	GS	Games started	MPG	Minutes per game
FG%	Field goal percentage	3P%	3-point field goal percentage	FT%	Free throw percentage
RPG	Rebounds per game	APG	Assists per game	SPG	Steals per game
BPG	Blocks per game	PPG	Points per game	**Bold**	Career high

Year	Team	GP	Points	FG%	3P%	FT%	RPG	APG	SPG	BPG	PPG
2005-06	Washington (St. Louis)	28	**183**	**43.8%**	25.9%	70.0%	2.4	3.5	**1.5**	**0.3**	6.5
2006-07	Washington (St. Louis)	9	96	42.2%	**40.9%**	52.4%	**2.8**	2.8	1.4	0.1	**10.7**
2007-08	Washington (St. Louis)	27	176	36.8%	40.0%	69.6%	2.3	3.1	0.8	0.0	6.5
2008-09	Washington (St. Louis)	**31**	158	36.1%	26.1%	**77.8%**	1.8	**3.5**	0.7	0.1	5.1
Career		95	613	39.2%	32.9%	67.6%	2.2	3.3	1.0	0.1	6.5
