= Guðrún Ósk Ámundadóttir =

Icelandic basketball player and coach

Personal information
- Born: 7 May 1987 (age 39)
- Listed height: 179 cm (5 ft 10 in)

Career information
- Playing career: 2003–2019
- Position: Guard
- Coaching career: 2019–2021

Career history

Playing
- 2003–2007: Haukar
- 2007–2009: KR
- 2009–2015: Haukar
- 2015–2019: Skallagrímur

Coaching
- 2018–2019: Skallagrímur (assistant)
- 2019–2021: Skallagrímur

Career highlights
- As player: 2× Icelandic champion (2006, 2007); 5× Icelandic Cup (2005, 2007, 2009, 2010, 2014); 3× Icelandic Company Cup (2005, 2006, 2011); Icelandic Super Cup (2006); 2× D1 winner (2004, 2016); As coach: Icelandic Cup (2020); Icelandic Super Cup (2020)

Career coaching record
- Úrvalsdeild kvenna: 23–23 (.500)

Guðrún Ósk Ámundadóttir (born 7 May 1987) is an Icelandic basketball coach and player and a former member of the Icelandic national basketball team. As a player, she won the national championship twice and the Icelandic Cup five times.

== Club career ==
After coming up through the junior programs of Skallagrímur, Guðrún started her senior team career with Haukar in 2003 and helped the team win two national championships and five Icelandic Cups. She played for KR from 2007 to 2009, winning the Icelandic Cup during her later season with the team.

She returned to her hometown team of Skallagrímur in 2015. In her first game, she posted a triple-double with 10 points, 10 rebounds and 11 assists. In 2017 she helped Skallagrímur to the Cup finals where it eventually lost to Valur. She retired from playing after being hired as the head coach of Skallagrímur in September 2019.

=== Titles ===
- Icelandic champion (2): 2006, 2007
- Icelandic Cup (5): 2005, 2007, 2009, 2010, 2014
- Icelandic Company Cup (3): 2005, 2006, 2011
- Icelandic Super Cup: 2006
- 1. deild kvenna (2) : 2004, 2016

== National team career ==
Guðrún played in nine games for the Icelandic national basketball team from 2008 to 2009.

== Coaching career ==
After serving as an assistant coach to Biljana Stanković for the 2018–19 season, she was hired as the head coach of Skallagrímur in September 2019. In February 2020, she guided Skallagrímur to its first major title since 1964 when the team defeated KR in the Icelandic Cup finals. In the Úrvalsdeild, the team posted á 15–10 record before the rest of the season was canceled due to the coronavirus pandemic in Iceland.

In May 2020, she signed a contract extension for the 2020–21 season. On 20 September 2020, she guided Skallagrímur to its first victory in the Icelandic Super Cup by defeating Valur 74–68. She resigned from her post as head coach on 1 July 2021.

=== Titles ===
- Icelandic Cup: 2020
- Icelandic Super Cup: 2020

== Personal life ==
Guðrún is the sister of basketball players Sigrún Sjöfn Ámundadóttir and Arna Hrönn Ámundadóttir.
