= 2018–19 Icelandic Women's Basketball Cup =

2018–2019 Bikarkeppni Kvenna
Tournament details
- Arena: Laugardalshöll; Reykjavík
- Dates: 13–16 February 2019

Final positions
- Champions: Valur
- Runners-up: Stjarnan

Awards and statistics
- MVP: (Iceland) Helena Sverrisdóttir
- Top scorer(s): (United States) Danielle Rodriguez

The 2018–2019 Bikarkeppni kvenna, referred to as Geysisbikarinn for sponsorship reasons, was the 45th edition of the Icelandic Women's Basketball Cup, won by Valur against Stjarnan. The competition is managed by the Icelandic Basketball Federation and the final four was held in the Laugardalshöll in Reykjavík during the days of 13–16 February 2019. Helena Sverrisdóttir was named the Cup Finals MVP after turning in 31 points, 13 rebounds and 6 assists.

Danielle Rodriguez of Stjarnan led all scorers with 104 points in 4 games.

== Participating teams ==
Sixteen teams signed up for the Cup tournament.

== Bracket ==
Quarterfinals
20 January
Keflavík	121
Fjölnir	61
20 January
Stjarnan	71
Skallagrímur	49
20 January
Snæfell	72
Haukar	68
20 January
Breiðablik	80
ÍR	44

Semifinals
13 February
Breiðablik	82
Stjarnan	103
13 February
Valur	83
Snæfell	72

Final
16 February
Stjarnan	74
Valur	90

== Cup Finals MVP ==
Pos.	Player	Team
SF	(Iceland) Helena Sverrisdóttir	Valur
