= Ámundadóttir =

Ámundadóttir is an Icelandic patronymic name. Notable people with the name include:

- Guðrún Ósk Ámundadóttir (born 1987), Icelandic basketball coach and player
- Laufey Ámundadóttir (born 1962), Icelandic cell biologist and geneticist
- Sigrún Sjöfn Ámundadóttir (born 1988), Icelandic basketball player
