= Isabella Ósk Sigurðardóttir =

Icelandic basketball player

Grindavík
- Position: Forward / center
- League: Úrvalsdeild kvenna

Personal information
- Born: 14 August 1997 (age 29) Iceland
- Listed height: 187 cm (6 ft 2 in)

Career information
- Playing career: 2013–present

Career history
- 2013–2022: Breiðablik
- 2022: South Adelaide Panthers
- 2022–2023: Njarðvík
- 2023: Zadar Plus
- 2023–2024: Panseraikos
- 2024: Njarðvík
- 2024–present: Grindavík

Career highlights
- 3× Úrvalsdeild Domestic All-First Team (2021, 2022, 2025); 1. deild kvenna winner (2014); 1. deild Domestic All-First team (2017); 1. deild Young Player of the Year (2016)

Isabella Ósk Sigurðardóttir (born 14 August 1997) is an Icelandic basketball player for Njarðvík and the Icelandic national basketball team.

== Club career ==
Isabella started her senior team career with Breiðablik in the Icelandic second-tier 1. deild kvenna during the 2013–14 season. She was named the 1. deild kvenna Young Player of the Year in 2016 and to the 1. deild kvenna All-First team in 2017 when the team was promoted to the Úrvalsdeild kvenna.

She started the 2018–19 season strong, averaging 9.6 points and 10.8 rebounds in the first five games and was named to the Úrvalsdeild Team of the Month in October. However, in November she was ruled out for the rest of the season after tearing her anterior cruciate ligament during practice. She missed most of the 2019–20 season but returned in end of January 2020 and averaged 4.6 points and 10.0 rebounds in the last 8 games.

In July 2020, Isabella re-signed with Breiðablik for the 2020–21 season. On 16 January 2021, she grabbed a career high 22 rebounds in a victory against KR. On 11 March, she upped her personal best with 28 rebounds while also scoring 21 points in a 93–76 victory against Snæfell. It was the most rebounds taken by an Icelandic player in the history of the Úrvalsdeild. She was named to the Úrvalsdeild Domestic All-First Team after averaging 10.8 points and 14.2 rebounds for the season.

In October 2021, she suffered an ankle injury and missed several games. She returned to form and on 31 January 2022, she had 25 points, 19 rebounds, 5 steals and 3 assists in a victory against reigning national champions Valur. For the season she averaged 14.4 points, 13.8 rebounds and 2.4 assists per game and was named to the Úrvalsdeild Domestic All-First Team for the second consecutive year.

In May 2022, Isabella signed with South Adelaide Panthers of the Australian NBL1 Central. In her debut, she had 7 points and 4 rebounds in 10 minutes in the Panthers' 81–73 win against the Sturt Sabres. For the season, she averaged 8.8 points and 9.2 rebounds in 21 minutes per game. Following the NBL1 Central season, she returned to Breiðablik.

On 31 October 2022, Isabella left Breiðablik, after appearing in 7 games, where she averaged 12.3 points and 13.3 rebounds, and signed with reigning national champions Njarðvík. For the season, she averaged 10.8 points og 11.3 rebounds. In the playoffs, she averaged 14.0 points and 12.3 rebounds in Njarðvík's first round loss.

In June 2023, she signed with Zadar Plus in the Croatian Premijer liga. She left the club in October, after appearing in two league games where she averaged 12.0 points and 10.0 rebounds, and signed with Panseraikosof the Greek A2 league.

On 23 January 2024, Isabela returned to Iceland and signed back with Njarðvík. For the season, she averaged 9.6 points, 8.2 rebounds and 1.4 assists.

In July 2024, Isabella signed with Grindavík.

== National team career ==
Isabella debuted with the Icelandic national team in 2017.

== Achievement ==
=== Awards ===
- Úrvalsdeild Domestic All-First Team: 2021, 2022
- 1. deild kvenna All-First team: 2017
- 1. deild kvenna Young Player of the Year: 2016

=== Titles ===
- 1. deild kvenna: 2014
