= 2014–15 Icelandic Women's Basketball Cup =

2014–2015 Bikarkeppni Kvenna
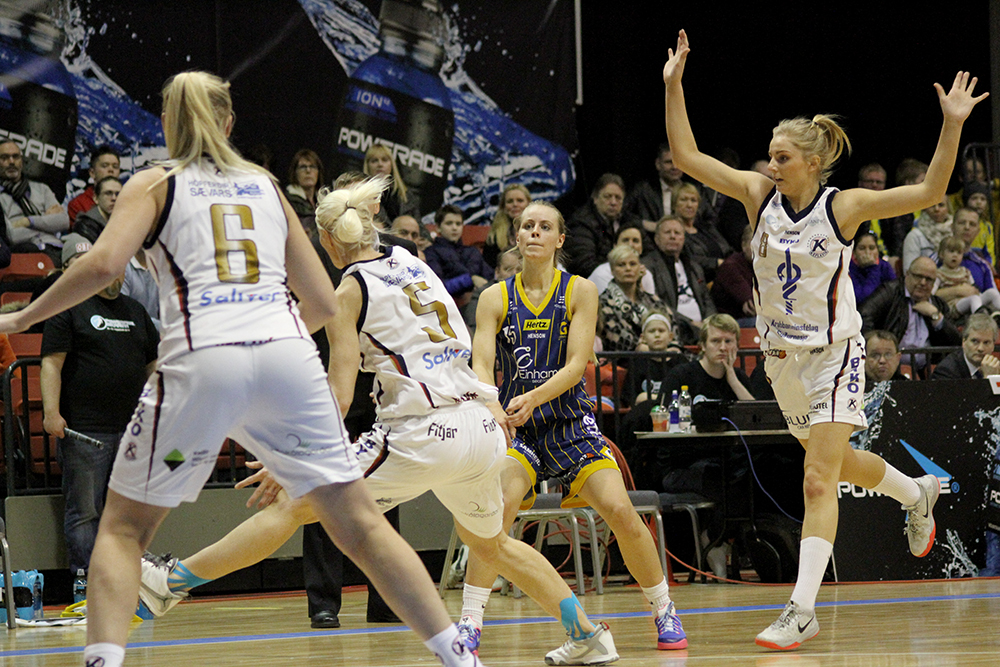
- Grindavík and Keflavík in the Cup final.

Tournament details
- Arena: Laugardalshöll (Final); Reykjavík
- Dates: 6 December 2014 – 21 February 2015

Final positions
- Champions: Grindavík
- Runners-up: Keflavík

Awards and statistics
- MVP: (Iceland) Petrúnella Skúladóttir
- Top scorer(s): (United States) Kristen McCarthy

The 2014–15 Bikarkeppni kvenna, named Powerade-bikarinn for sponsorship reasons, was the 41st edition of the Icelandic Women's Basketball Cup, won by Grindavík against Keflavík. The competition was managed by the Icelandic Basketball Federation and the final was held in the Laugardalshöll in Reykjavík on 21 February 2015. Petrúnella Skúladóttir was named the Cup Finals MVP after posting 17 points, 10 rebounds and 5 steals in the win.

Kristen McCarthy of Snæfell led all scorers in the Cup with 78 points in 3 games.

== Participating teams ==
Sixteen teams signed up for the Cup tournament.

== Bracket ==
Quarterfinals
17 January
Grindavík	97
Haukar	90
17 January
Snæfell	87
Valur	65
18 January
Njarðvík	56
KR	49
19 January
Keflavík	87
Breiðablik	52

Semifinals
31 January
Keflavík	81
Snæfell	64
02 February
Grindavík	81
Njarðvík	47

Final
21 February
Grindavík	68
Keflavík	61

== Cup Finals MVP ==
Pos.	Player	Team
SF	(Iceland) Petrúnella Skúladóttir	Grindavík
