= Auður Íris Ólafsdóttir =

Icelandic basketball player (born 1992)

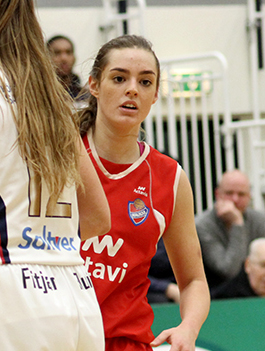
- Auður Íris in January 2015.

Personal information
- Born: 29 August 1992 (age 34) Iceland
- Listed height: 170 cm (5 ft 7 in)
- Listed weight: 66 kg (146 lb)

Career information
- Playing career: 2009–2020
- Position: Guard
- Coaching career: 2021–present

Career history

Playing
- 2009–2016: Haukar
- 2016: Skallagrímur
- 2017–2018: Breiðablik
- 2018–2019: Stjarnan
- 2019: Haukar
- 2020: ÍR
- 2020: Valur

Coaching
- 2021–2023: Stjarnan
- 2023: Stjarnan-b

Career highlights
- As player: Úrvalsdeild Defensive Player of the Year (2019); Icelandic Cup (2010, 2014); Icelandic Company Cup (2011, 2015); As coach: 1. deild kvenna Coach of the Year (2023); 1. deild kvenna winner (2023)

Auður Íris Ólafsdóttir (born 29 August 1992) is an Icelandic basketball coach and player who is a former member of the Icelandic national basketball team. In 2019, she was named Úrvalsdeild Defensive Player of the Year.

== Playing career ==
=== Club career ===
Auður Íris started her senior career with Haukar in 2009 and helped the team to the Úrvalsdeild finals in 2011, 2014 and 2016. After Haukar lost in the Úrvalsdeild finals in 2016, Auður signed with Skallagrímur. She left Skallagrímur in December, In January 2017, she signed with 1. deild kvenna club Breiðablik where she helped the club achieve promotion to the Úrvalsdeild. In 2018, she signed with Stjarnan and in 2019 she was named the Úrvalsdeild Defensive Player of the Year. After the season, she signed back with her hometown team of Haukar. In November 2019, it was reported that she had left the team after playing four games. In February 2020 she signed with 1. deild kvenna club Íþróttafélag Reykjavíkur.

On 7 August 2020, Auður signed with Úrvalsdeild club Valur.

=== National team career ===
Auður Íris debuted for the Icelandic national basketball team in 2015.

== Coaching career ==
On 23 June 2021, Auður Íris was hired as the head coach of Stjarnan. In 2023, she led the team to win in 1. deild kvenna and promotion to the top-tier Úrvalsdeild kvenna. Following the season, she was named the 1. deild Coach of the Year. The following season, she coached both Stjarnan in the Úrvalsdeild and Stjarnan-b in the 1. deild kvenna. On 13 December 2023, with the main team in third place in the Úrvalsdeild, the club announced that she had requested to step down as head coach of both teams.

== Personal life ==
Auður Íris is the daughter of Ólafur Rafnsson, the former president of FIBA Europe. Her younger sister, Sigrún Björg Ólafsdóttir, is a member of the Icelandic national team.

== Trophies and awards ==
=== Trophies ===
- Icelandic Cup: 2010, 2014
- Icelandic Company Cup: 2011, 2015

=== Awards ===
- Úrvalsdeild Defensive Player of the Year: 2019
- 1. deild kvenna Coach of the Year: 2023
