= Simona Podesvová =

Slovak professional basketball player (born 1983)

Personal information
- Born: 15 October 1983 (age 43) Ostrava, Czechoslovakia
- Listed height: 1.86 m (6 ft 1 in)
- Position: Small forward

Career history
- 2002–2004: USK Blex
- 2004–2005: USK Praha
- 2005–2006: BK Loko Trutnov
- 2006–2007: BK Kara Trutnov
- 2007–2011: MBK Ružomberok
- 2011–2012: UNB Obenasa Navarra
- 2013–2014: Visby Ladies
- 2014–2015: Reims BC
- 2015–2016: UNB Obenasa Navarra
- 2016: CAB Madeira
- 2017–2018: Voiron
- 2018–2019: Valur

Career highlights
- Icelandic champion (2019); Icelandic Cup winner (2019); Vitor Hugo Cup winner (2016); Vitor Hugo Cup MVP (2016)

Simona Podesvová (born 15 October 1983) is a Slovak professional basketball player who last played for Valur of the Úrvalsdeild kvenna, where she won the Icelandic championship and the Icelandic Cup in 2019.

== Professional career ==
Podesvová spent the 2013–2014 season with the Visby Ladies in the Basketligan dam where she averaged 14.9 points and 11.7 rebounds.

On 2 October 2016, she won the Vitor Hugo Cup with CAB Madeira and was named the Cup's MVP after delivering 8 points and 18 rebounds in the 58–41 victory against AD Vagos.

In September 2018, Podesvová signed with Valur of the Icelandic Úrvalsdeild kvenna. On 9 January 2019, she grabbed a season high 20 rebounds against Skallagrímur. On 13 February 2019, she helped Valur to the Icelandic Cup finals after posting 3 points and game high 14 rebounds in a 83–72 victory against Snæfell in the semi-finals. On 16 February 2019, she won the Icelandic Cup after Valur defeated Stjarnan in the Cup finals, 74–90. On 27 April 2019, she helped Valur win its first ever national championship after beating Keflavík in the Úrvalsdeild finals 3–0.

== National team career ==
Podesvová played internationally for Slovakia, taking part in the EuroBasket Women 2011.
