= Sigrún Sjöfn Ámundadóttir =

Icelandic basketball player (born 1988)

Personal information
- Born: 29 November 1988 (age 37)
- Listed height: 181 cm (5 ft 11 in)

Career information
- Playing career: 2004–2023
- Position: Forward
- Number: 9, 12, 15

Career history

Playing
- 2004–2007: Haukar
- 2007–2009: KR
- 2009–2010: Hamar
- 2010–2011: Olympique Sannois
- 2011–2014: KR
- 2014–2015: Norrköping Dolphins
- 2015: Skallagrímur
- 2015–2016: Grindavík
- 2016–2021: Skallagrímur
- 2021–2023: Fjölnir
- 2023: Haukar

Coaching
- 2022–2023: Fjölnir (assistant)
- 2024: Haukar (assistant)

Career highlights
- As player: 6× Úrvalsdeild Domestic All-First Team (2008, 2009, 2012, 2014, 2016, 2017); 2× Icelandic champion (2006, 2007); 4× Icelandic Basketball Cup (2005, 2007, 2009, 2020); 3× Icelandic Supercup (2006, 2011, 2020)

Sigrún Sjöfn Ámundadóttir (born 23 November 1988) is an Icelandic former basketball player. During her career, she has won the Icelandic championship two times, in 2006 and 2007, and the Icelandic Basketball Cup four times. She is the Úrvalsdeild kvenna all-time career leader in rebounds and in the league's top four in scoring, assists, steals and games played.

== Playing career ==
After coming up through the junior ranks of Skallagrímur, Sigrún started her senior career with Haukar in 2004, and helped the club to two national championships in 2006 and 2007. She joined KR prior the 2007–2008 season. She averaged 11.3 points and 11.3 rebounds for the season, helping KR to the second best record in the league. During the playoffs KR advanced to the Úrvalsdeild finals where it lost to Keflavík 0–3. She helped KR win the Icelandic Basketball Cup in 2009, leading the team in scoring in the Cup finals game with 18 points. She reached the Úrvalsdeild finals again in 2009 with KR and 2010 with Hamar, losing both times.

In 2010, Sigrún signed with French club Olympique Sannois Saint-Gratien. Despite being offered a contract extension, she left the club after the season's end and signed with KR.

In 2014, Sigrún signed with Basketligan dam club Norrköping Dolphins where she averaged 9.3 points and 5.4 rebounds in 27 regular season and playoffs games. She returned to Iceland in 2015 and joined her hometown club Skallagrímur in the Division I. She left the club after two games, where she averaged 31.5 points and 8.5 rebounds, and signed with Grindavík. In 2016, Sigrún returned to Skallagrímur after the team achieved promotion to the Úrvalsdeild.

On February 8, 2017, in the Basketball Cup semi-finals, Sigrún made a three-point shot with 4.6 seconds left that gave Skallagrímur a 70–68 victory against Snæfell and seat in the Cup finals for the first time in the club's history. In the Cup finals, Skallagrímur lost to Keflavík, 65–62. In the Úrvalsdeild playoffs, Skallagrímur met Keflavík again in the semi-finals. Despite winning the first game, Skallagrímur lost the next three and Keflavík advanced to the finals.

Sigrún averaged 10.8 points, 7.4 rebounds and 3.4 assists during a difficult 2018–19 season where Skallagrímur stumbled to a 6–22 record, barely staving off relegation. In September 2019, Sigrún re-signed with Skallagrímur for the 2019–20 season.

On 15 February 2020, Sigrún helped Skallagrímur win the Icelandic Basketball Cup for the first time, defeating KR in the cup finals.

On 20 September 2020, she won the Icelandic Super Cup after Skallagrímur defeated Valur 74–68.

On 16 August 2021, Sigrún signed with Fjölnir. On 26 March 2022, she became the Úrvalsdeild all-time leader in rebounds when she broke Hildur Sigurðardóttir's record of 2,882 career rebounds. In January 2023, following Fjölnir's loss to winless ÍR, she resigned as a player and assistant coach, citing different vision of the team tactics and play with head coach Kristjana Eir Jónsdóttir.

On 27 January 2023, Sigrún signed with Haukar. On 8 March, she became the Úrvalsdeild kvenna all-time leader in games played, breaking Birna Valgarðsdóttir's record of 375 games. Following the season, she announced her retirement from basketball.

In January 2024, she was hired as an assistant coach to Haukar.

== National team career ==
Sigrún was first selected to the Icelandic national basketball team in 2007 and as of 2018 she has played 53 games for the team.

== Personal life ==
Sigrún has two sisters who have played in the Úrvalsdeild kvenna, Guðrún Ósk Ámundadóttir (born 1987) and Arna Hrönn Ámundadóttir (born 2001).

== Awards, titles and accomplishments ==
=== Individual awards ===
- Úrvalsdeild Domestic All-First Team (6): 2008, 2009, 2012, 2014, 2016, 2017

=== Titles ===
- Icelandic champion (2): 2006, 2007
- Icelandic Basketball Cup (4): 2005, 2007, 2009, 2020
- Icelandic Supercup (2): 2006, 2011
- Icelandic Company Cup (2): 2005, 2006

=== Accomplishments ===
- Icelandic All-Star game (6): 2006–2010, 2013
- Úrvalsdeild kvenna all-time career rebounding leader
