= Embla Kristínardóttir =

Icelandic basketball player (born 1995)

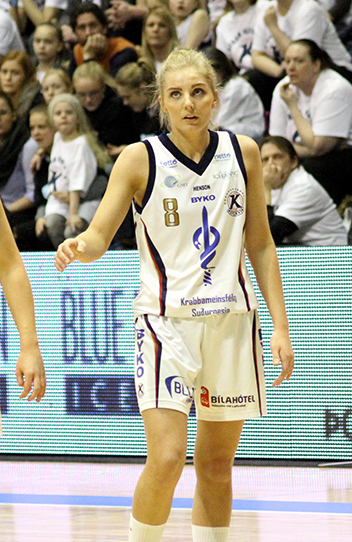
- Embla in the 2015 Cup finals.

No. 2 – Skallagrímur
- Position: Point guard / shooting guard
- League: 1. deild kvenna

Personal information
- Born: 27 October 1995 (age 31) Keflavík, Iceland
- Listed height: 170 cm (5 ft 7 in)

Career information
- Playing career: 2012–present

Career history
- 2012–2015: Keflavík
- 2015–2017: Grindavík
- 2017–2019: Keflavík
- 2020: Fjölnir
- 2020–2021: Skallagrímur
- 2022–2023: Valur
- 2026–present: Skallagrímur

Career highlights
- 2× Icelandic champion (2013, 2023); 2× Icelandic Basketball Cup (2013, 2018); 3× Icelandic Supercup (2012, 2018, 2020); Icelandic Company Cup (2014)
Medals
Women's basketball
Representing Iceland
Games of the Small States of Europe
Silver medal – second place	2013 Luxembourg	Team
Silver medal – second place	2015 Iceland	Team
Silver medal – second place	2017 San Marino	Team
Silver medal – second place	2019 Bar	Team

Ingunn Embla Kristínardóttir (born 27 October 1995) is an Icelandic basketball player. She won the Icelandic championship in 2013 with Keflavík. The same year, she debuted for the Icelandic national basketball team. In 2023, she won her second Icelandic championship with Valur.

== Early life ==
Embla was born in Keflavík. She grew up in Skagaströnd before the family moved again to Keflavík where she starting playing basketball with Keflavík's junior teams.

== Playing career ==
=== Club career ===
Embla played her first senior games with Keflavík during the 2012–2013 season where she averaged 6.8 points and 2.3 assists in 35 regular season and playoffs game and helped the club to both the national championship and the Icelandic Cup. She missed most of the following season due to pregnancy.

In January 2015, she helped Keflavík to the Cup finals, but was unable to prevent a loss to Grindavík. In February 2015, Embla received a two-game suspension from the Icelandic Basketball Federation disciplinary court for kicking Gunnhildur Gunnarsdóttir. She helped Keflavík to the Úrvalsdeild finals where they lost 0–3 to Snæfell. For the season, Embla averaged 8.1 points, 4.5 rebounds and 2.1 assists.

In August 2015, she signed a two-year contract with Grindavík. In 2016, she helped Grindavík take a 2–1 lead against Haukar in the semi-finals of the Úrvalsdeild kvenna playoffs. Haukar won the next two games and advanced to the finals. The next season, Embla was unable to prevent Grindavík from being relegated but agreed to play with the team during the 2017-2018 Division I season.

Unhappy with new coach Angela Rodriguez, Embla left Grindavík in December 2017, after averaging 21.3 points, 12.4 rebounds and 5.0 assists, and returned to Keflavík. On January 13, 2018, she won the Icelandic Cup with Keflavík after defeating Njarðvík in the Cup finals, 74–63. She led all Keflavík players in scoring with 20 points.

In January 2020, Embla signed with Fjölnir. In her debut, she had 10 points, 7 rebounds and 2 steals in 13 minutes. She averaged 12.0 points and 5.3 rebounds in 6 games before the rest of the season was canceled due to the coronavirus pandemic in Iceland.

On 15 May 2020, Embla signed with reigning Icelandic Cup champions Skallagrímur. On 20 September 2020, she scored 10 points in Skallagrímur's 74–68 victory against Valur in the Icelandic Super Cup. For the season, she averaged 7.8 points, 5.3 rebounds and 2.8 assists. She remained with Skallagrímur the following season but in December 2021 she announced she would miss the rest of the season due to pregnancy. In four Úrvalsdeild games, she averaged 12.5 points, 5.5 rebounds and 1.3 assists per game.

In November 2022, Embla signed with Valur. On 28 April 2023, she won her first Icelandic championship after Valur defeated top-seeded Keflavík in the Úrvalsdeild finals, 3–1. In the championship clinching game, she scored the go-ahead basket with a three-point shot with 26 seconds left in the game.

=== National team career ===
Between 2013 and 2019, Embla played 21 games for the Icelandic women's national basketball team. She helped the team to silver at the 2013, 2015 and the 2017 Games of the Small States of Europe.

In an interview with RÚV in January 2018, she stated that she would no longer play for the national team if the Icelandic Basketball Federation would continue to select players convicted of sexual crimes to their national team programs.

In November 2018, Embla was selected to the team ahead of its games against Slovakia and Bosnia and Herzegovina in the EuroBasket Women 2019 qualification.

== Personal life ==
When Embla was 13 years old, she was raped by a 20 year old member of the Icelandic national track and field team. The man was convicted of the crime but received a suspended sentence. Her story was featured in RÚV coverage of the Me Too movement in Iceland in January 2018.

From 2016 to 2017, Embla struggled with Bulimia. She was ultimately helped by coach Helgi Jónas Guðfinnsson to return to health.
