= Vestri (women's basketball) =

Icelandic basketball team

- Founded: 1965 (as KFÍ)
- History: KFÍ (1965–2016); Vestri (2016–present)
- Arena: Ísjakinn (capacity: 1200)
- Location: Ísafjörður, Iceland
- Team colors: Navy blue, red, white
- Website: Vestri.is
| Home | Away |

The Vestri women's basketball team, commonly known as Vestri, is a basketball team based in Ísafjörður, Iceland. It is part of the Vestri multi-sport club.

== History ==
The club was founded in 1965 as Körfuknattleiksfélag Ísafjarðar (KFÍ). In 1969, KFÍ won the Vesturland's group and was slated to face Þór Akureyri, which won the Norðurland's group, in a game for the national championship. KFÍ forfeited the game as they could not field a team at the date of the game. The team participated in the top-tier Úrvalsdeild kvenna from 1999 to 2002, advancing to the semi-finals in the Úrvalsdeild playoffs in 2001. It made it into the final four of the Icelandic Cup in 2000 and 2001. In 2016 KFÍ merged into Íþróttafélagið Vestri and became its basketball sub-division. After playing in the 2. deild kvenna for the 2018–2019 season, the team returned to the second-tier 1. deild kvenna in June 2020.

In July 2021, Dimitris Zacharias was hired as the head coach of the team. In end of November, Zacharias resigned and was replaced by former coach Pétur Már Sigurðsson. In June 2022, the board decided not to register the team for the next season competition.

== Trophies and awards ==
=== Awards ===
Úrvalsdeild Women's Foreign Player of the Year

- Jessica Gaspar – 2001
- Ebony Dickinson – 2000

Úrvalsdeild Women's Domestic All-First Team

- Sólveig Helga Gunnlaugsdóttir – 2001

Úrvalsdeild Women's Young Player of the Year

- Sara Pálmadóttir – 2002

1. deild kvenna Domestic All-First team

- Eva Margrét Kristjánsdóttir – 2015

== Notable players ==
Criteria

To appear in this section a player must have either:

- Played at least three seasons for the club.
- Set a club record or won an individual award while at the club.
- Played at least one official international match for their national team at any time.
- Played at least one official WNBA match at any time.

- (United States) Ebony Dickinson
- (Iceland) Eva Margrét Kristjánsdóttir
- (United States) Jessica Gaspar
- (Iceland) Sara Pálmadóttir
- (Iceland) Sigríður Guðjónsdóttir
- (Iceland) Sólveig Helga Gunnlaugsdóttir
- (Iceland) Sólveig Pálsdóttir
- (Iceland) Stefanía Helga Ásmundsdóttir
- (Iceland) Svandís Anna Sigurðardóttir
- (Iceland) Tinna Björk Sigmundsdóttir

== Head coaches ==
Women's head coaches since 1996:

- Karl Jónsson 1999–2001
- Krste Seramofski 2001–2002
- Neil Shiran Þórisson 2002–2003
- Hrafn Kristjánsson 2003–2004
- Tom Hull 2004–2005
- Pance Ilievski 2010–2011
- Pétur Már Sigurðsson 2011–2013
- Labrenthia Murdock Pearson 2014–2015
- Helga Salóme Ingimarsdóttir 2018–2019
- Pétur Már Sigurðsson 2020–2021
- Dimitris Zacharias 2021
- Pétur Már Sigurðsson 2021–2022
- Gwen Chappell-Muhammad 2025–2026
- Jonathan Braeger 2026–
