= Darri Freyr Atlason =

Icelandic basketball coach

Personal information
- Born: 1 June 1994 (age 32) Iceland
- Listed height: 183 cm (6 ft 0 in)

Career information
- Playing career: 2011–2015
- Coaching career: 2015–present

Career history

Playing
- 2011–2015: KR

Coaching
- 2015–2016: KR
- 2017–2020: Valur
- 2020–2021: KR

Career highlights
- As player: 2× Icelandic champion (2014, 2015); Icelandic Company Cup (2013); Icelandic Super Cup (2014); As coach: Icelandic Women's champion (2019); Icelandic Women's Cup (2019); Icelandic Women's Super Cup (2019)

Darri Freyr Atlason is an Icelandic basketball coach and sports commentator. In 2019, he led Valur women's team to both its first national championship and first Icelandic Cup win. As a player, he won two national championships with KR in 2014 and 2015.

== Playing career ==
Darri came up through the junior ranks of KR and played his first senior game with the team during the 2011–12 Úrvalsdeild karla season. He retired from playing in 2015 to fully focus on coaching.

== Coaching career ==
Darri was hired as the head coach of 1. deild kvenna club KR in 2015. He led them to second place finish during the 2015–2016 season and was named the 1. deild kvenna Coach of the year.

Prior to coaching senior teams Darri coached youth programs in KR, winning multiple national and cup championships in various age groups.

In 2017, Darri was hired as the head coach of Valur of the top-tier Úrvalsdeild kvenna. During his first season he led the team to the Úrvalsdeild finals where it lost to Haukar.

In 2019, he guided Valur to the best record in the league, the Icelandic Cup and its first national championship.

The team opened the 2019–20 season by defeating Keflavík, 105-81, in the annual Icelandic Super Cup. It was Valur's first Super Cup win and the victory made them the holders of all four major national crowns, the others being the national championship, the national cup and the league championship which is awarded for the best regular season record in the Úrvalsdeild.

In beginning of May 2020, Darri stepped down as head coach of Valur. Later that month, on 25 May, he was introduced as the new head coach of reigning men's national champions KR.

During the 2021–22 season, he led KR to a fifth place finish. In the playoffs, KR beat Reykjavík rivals Valur in the first round but got swept by Keflavík in the semi-finals. In June 2021, he resigned as head coach to focus on his work in business development for the financial technology company Lucinity.

== Personal life ==
Darri Freyr is the older brother of basketball player Almar Orri Atlason. Darri Freyr is currently getting his master in business from Harvard Business School.

== Awards, titles and accomplishments ==
=== Coaching ===
==== Individual awards ====
- 1. deild kvenna Coach of the year : 2019

==== Titles ====
- Icelandic champion: 2019
- Icelandic Cup: 2019
- Icelandic Super Cup: 2019
