= Petrúnella Skúladóttir =

Icelandic basketball player

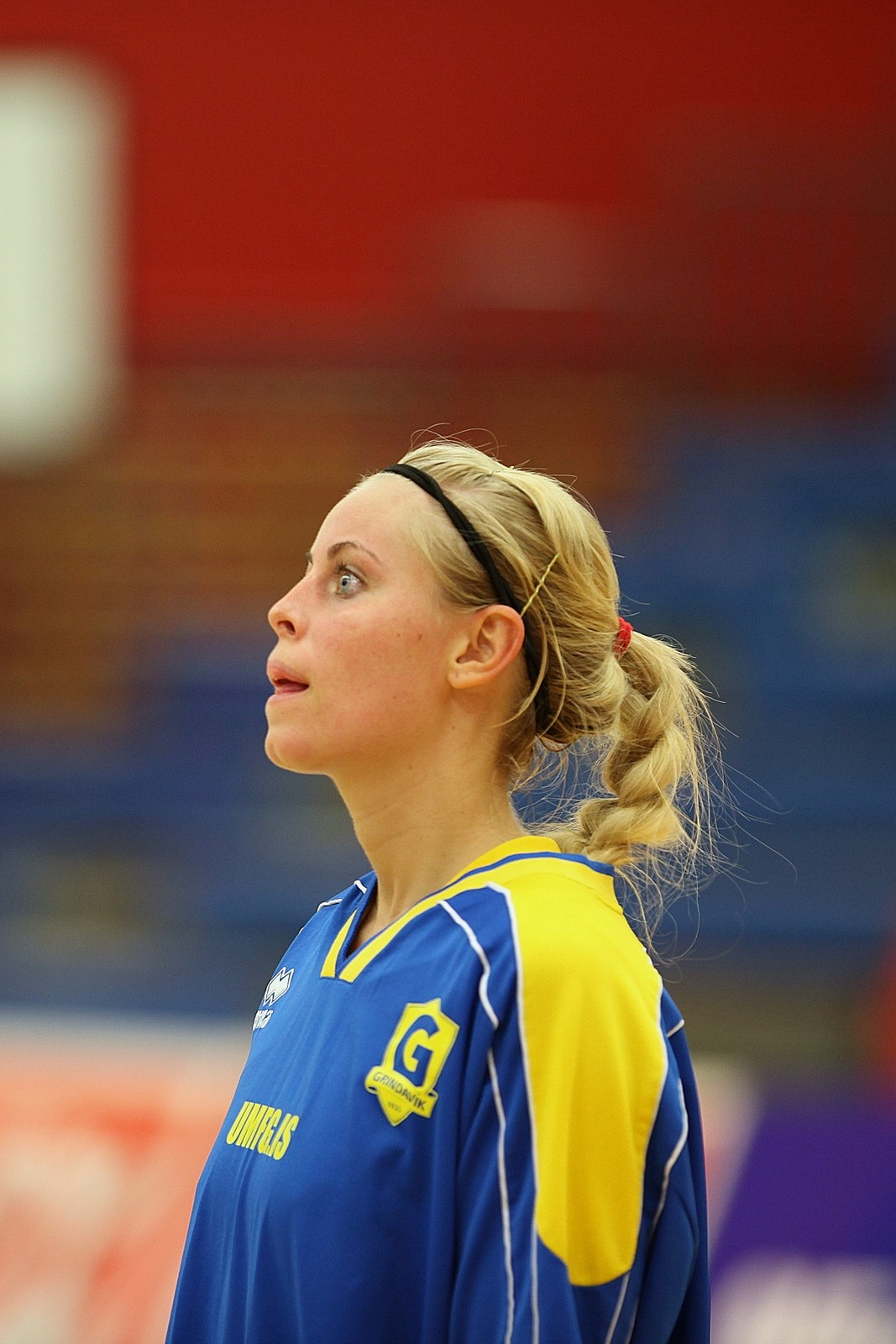

Personal information
- Born: 1 August 1985 (age 41)
- Listed height: 177 cm (5 ft 10 in)

Career information
- Playing career: 1999–2020
- Position: Forward

Career history
- 1999–2004: Grindavík
- 2004–2005: Njarðvík
- 2005–2010: Grindavík
- 2011–2012: Njarðvík
- 2012–2013: Grindavík
- 2014–2017: Grindavík
- 2019–2020: Grindavík-b

Career highlights
- Icelandic championship (2012); 3× Icelandic Basketball Cup (2008, 2012, 2015); Icelandic Company Cup (2002); 2× Úrvalsdeild Domestic All-First Team (2012, 2015); Icelandic Cup Finals MVP (2015)
Medals
Women's basketball
Representing Iceland
Games of the Small States of Europe
| Silver medal – second place | 2009 Cyprus | National Team |
| Silver medal – second place | 2013 Luxembourg | National Team |
| Silver medal – second place | 2015 Iceland | National Team |

Petrúnella Skúladóttir (born 1 August 1985) is an Icelandic former basketball player and a former member of the Icelandic national basketball team. During her career, she won the Icelandic championship once, with Njarðvík in 2012, and the Icelandic Basketball Cup three times. She was named twice to the Úrvalsdeild Domestic All-First Team and was named the Icelandic Cup Finals MVP in 2015.

== Playing career ==
Petrúnella started her senior team career with Grindavík in 1999. After receiving little playing time at the start of the 2004–05 season, she transferred to Njarðvík in November 2004. In January, she suffered an elbow injury that forced her to miss the rest of the season.

In 2008, she helped Grindavík to its first Icelandic Cup by posting 15 points, 10 rebounds and 6 assists in a 77–67 victory against Haukar in the Cup final.

After sitting out the 2010–11 season, Petrúnella joined Njarðvík again for the 2011–12 season. She had a standout season with Njarðvík, helping the team win both the national Cup and the national championship. After the season she was named to the Úrvalsdeild Domestic All-First Team.

In September 2012, Petrúnella signed back with Grindavík. After missing the 2013–14 season due to pregnancy, she had a strong comeback in 2014-15 and helped Grindavík to its second Icelandic Cup win after beating Keflavík in the Cup final. She was named the Icelandic Cup Finals MVP after posting 17 points, 10 rebounds and 5 steals in the win.

In the third game of the 2015–16 season, Petrúnella suffered a concussion and missed several weeks. She returned to average 10.1 points and 3.2 rebounds in 19 regular season games.

In 27 games during the 2016–2017 season, Petrúnella averaged 9.2 points, 6.0 rebounds and 2.2 assists.

After having retired in 2017, Petrúnella returned to the court during the 2019–2020 season, appearing in 15 games for Grindavík-b in the second-tier 1. deild kvenna where she finished third in the league in scoring and rebounding.

== National team career ==
From 2004 to 2015, Petrúnella played 28 games for the Icelandic national basketball team. She competed three times with Iceland at the Games of the Small States of Europe.

== Personal life ==
Petrúnella's younger sister is former basketball player Hrund Skúladóttir.
