= Hallveig Jónsdóttir =

Icelandic basketball player

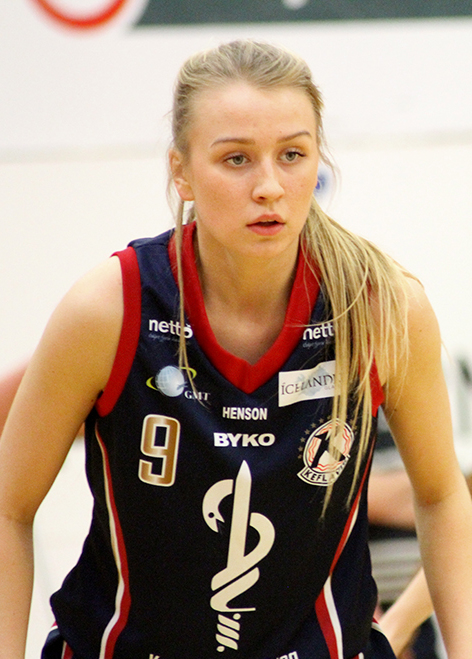
- Hallveig with Keflavík in 2014.

Personal information
- Born: 9 July 1995 (age 31)
- Listed height: 180 cm (5 ft 11 in)

Career information
- Playing career: 2011–2023
- Position: Shooting guard
- Number: 6

Career history
- 2011–2014: Valur
- 2014–2015: Keflavík
- 2015–2023: Valur

Career highlights
- 3× Icelandic Championship (2019, 2021, 2023); Icelandic Cup (2019); Icelandic Super Cup (2019); 2× Icelandic Company Cup (2013, 2014)

Career Úrvalsdeild kvenna statistics
- Games: 353
Medals
Women's basketball
Representing Iceland
Games of the Small States of Europe
Silver medal – second place	2017 San Marino	National Team
Silver medal – second place	2019 Montenegro	National Team

Hallveig Jónsdóttir (born 9 July 1995) is an Icelandic former basketball player and a former member of the Icelandic national basketball team. During her career, she won the Icelandic Championship three times and the Icelandic Cup once.

== Career ==
Hallveig started playing basketball at the age of nine with Breiðablik's junior teams. In 2012, she joined Valur where she played for three seasons before transferring to Keflavík in 2014. During her lone season with Keflavík, she won the Icelandic Company Cup in September 2014.

During the 2018–19 season, she helped Valur earn its first major trophies in women's basketball after the team won both the national championship and the Icelandic Cup. During the regular season, she averaged 9.8 points per game while shooting 35.2% from the three point range.

Valur started the 2019–20 season by defeating Keflavík, 105–81, in the annual Icelandic Super Cup. It was Valur's first Super Cup win and the victory made them the holders of all four major national crowns, the others being the national championship, the national cup and the league championship which is awarded for the best regular season record in the Úrvalsdeild. On 13 February 2020, she scored 29 points, including 7 three pointers, in a 99–105 overtime loss against Reykjavík rivals KR.

On 2 June 2021, she won the national championship after Valur beat Haukar 3–0 in the Úrvalsdeild finals.

On 28 April 2023, she won her third Icelandic championship after Valur defeated top-seeded Keflavík in the Úrvalsdeild finals, 3–1.

On 13 June 2023, she announced her retirement from basketball.

== Icelandic national team ==
After playing with most of Iceland's junior national teams, Hallveig debuted with the senior team in 2013. She participated with the team at the Games of the Small States of Europe in 2017 and 2019. Between 2013 and 2021, she played 25 games for the national team.
