= Úrvalsdeild Women's Defensive Player of the Year =

Award for the top-tier women' basketball league in Iceland

The Women's Defensive Player of the Year is an award for the top-tier women' basketball league in Iceland, the Úrvalsdeild kvenna.

== All-time award winners ==
The following is a list of the all-time Úrvalsdeild Women's Defensive Player of the Year winners.

Season	Player	Team
2002–2003	(Iceland) Birna Valgarðsdóttir	Keflavík
2003–2004	(Iceland) Hildur Sigurðardóttir	KR
2004–2005	(Iceland) Pálína Gunnlaugsdóttir	Haukar
2005–2006	(Iceland) Pálína Gunnlaugsdóttir (2x)	Haukar
2006–2007	(Iceland) Pálína Gunnlaugsdóttir (3x)	Haukar
2007–2008	(Iceland) Pálína Gunnlaugsdóttir (4x)	Keflavík
2008–2009	(Iceland) Guðrún Gróa Þorsteinsdóttir	KR
2009–2010	(Iceland) Guðrún Gróa Þorsteinsdóttir (2x)	KR
2010–2011	(Iceland) Guðrún Gróa Þorsteinsdóttir (3x)	KR
2011–2012	(Iceland) Pálína Gunnlaugsdóttir (5x)	Keflavík
2012–2013	(Iceland) Pálína Gunnlaugsdóttir (6x)	Keflavík
2013–2014	(Iceland) Guðrún Gróa Þorsteinsdóttir (4x)	Snæfell
2014–2015	(Iceland) Gunnhildur Gunnarsdóttir	Snæfell
2015–2016	(Iceland) Gunnhildur Gunnarsdóttir (2x )	Snæfell
2016–2017	(Iceland) Salbjörg Ragna Sævarsdóttir	Keflavík
2017–2018	(Iceland) Dýrfinna Arnardóttir	Haukar
2018–2019	(Iceland) Auður Íris Ólafsdóttir	Stjarnan
2019–2020	None selected after season was canceled due to the coronavirus pandemic in Iceland	
2020–2021	(Iceland) Dagbjört Dögg Karlsdóttir	Valur
2021–20222	...	
2021–2022	(Iceland) Erna Hákonardóttir	Njarðvík
