= 2001–02 Úrvalsdeild kvenna (basketball) =

Úrvalsdeild kvenna
- Duration: 13 October 2001 – 14 April 2002
- Teams: 6

Regular season
- Top seed: ÍS
- Relegated: KFÍ

Finals
- Champions: KR (13th title)
- Runners-up: ÍS
- Semi-finalists: Keflavík, Grindavík

Awards
- Domestic MVP: (Iceland) Alda Leif Jónsdóttir
- Foreign MVP: (United States) Jessica Gaspar

Statistical leaders
Points	(Iceland) Alda Leif Jónsdóttir	19.0
Rebounds	(United States) Jessica Gaspar	13.7
Assists	(Iceland) Alda Leif Jónsdóttir	5.2

The 2001–02 Úrvalsdeild kvenna was the 44th season of the Úrvalsdeild kvenna, the top tier women's basketball league in Iceland. The season started on 13 October 2001 and ended on 14 April 2002. KR won its 13th title by defeating ÍS 3–2 in the Finals.

== Competition format ==
The participating teams first played a conventional round-robin schedule with every team playing each opponent twice "home" and twice "away" for a total of 20 games. The top four teams qualified for the championship playoffs while none were relegated to Division I due to vacant berths.

== Regular season ==
Pos	Team	Pld	W	L	PF	PA	PD	Pts	Qualification or relegation
1	ÍS	20	16	4	1376	1077	+299	32	Qualification to playoffs
2	KR	20	14	6	1456	1123	+333	28	Qualification to playoffs
3	Keflavík	20	13	7	1409	1279	+130	26	Qualification to playoffs
4	Grindavík	20	12	8	1403	1394	+9	24	Qualification to playoffs
5	Njarðvík	20	4	16	1170	1496	−326	8	
6	KFÍ	20	1	19	1041	1486	−445	2	Relegated

Source: Úrvalsdeild kvenna 2001–2002

== Playoffs ==
=== Bracket ===
Semifinals
1	ÍS	2
4	Grindavík	0
2	KR	2
3	Keflavík	1

Finals
1	ÍS	2
2	KR	3

=== Semifinals ===
Team 1	Series	Team 2	Game 1	Game 2	Game 3
ÍS	2–0	Grindavík	74–59	77–69	
KR	2–1	Keflavík	60–54	43–51	63–62

=== Final ===
Team 1	Series	Team 2	Game 1	Game 2	Game 3	Game 4	Game 5
ÍS	2–3	KR	86–82	78–75	51–54	56–63	64–68

Source: 2002 Úrvalsdeild kvenna playoffs

== Awards ==
All official awards of the 2001–02 season.

=== Domestic Player of the Year ===
Pos.	Player	Team
PG	(Iceland) Alda Leif Jónsdóttir	ÍS

=== Foreign Player of the Year ===
Pos.	Player	Team
PG	(United States) Jessica Gaspar	Grindavík

=== Domestic All-First Team ===
Player	Team
(Iceland) Alda Leif Jónsdóttir	ÍS
(Iceland) Birna Valgarðsdóttir	Keflavík
(Iceland) Erla Þorsteinsdóttir	Keflavík
(Iceland) Helga Þorvaldsdóttir	KR
(Iceland) Hildur Sigurðardóttir	Keflavík
(Iceland) Lovísa Guðmundsdóttir	ÍS

=== Best Young Player Award ===
Pos.	Player	Team
C	(Iceland) Sara Pálmadóttir	KFÍ

=== Best Coach ===
Coach	Team
(Iceland) Anna María Sveinsdóttir	Keflavík
