= 2000–01 Úrvalsdeild kvenna (basketball) =

Úrvalsdeild kvenna
- Duration: October 14, 2000 – March 31, 2001
- Teams: 5

Regular season
- Top seed: KR
- Relegated: None

Finals
- Champions: KR (12th title)
- Runners-up: Keflavík
- Semi-finalists: ÍS, KFÍ

Awards
- Domestic MVP: (Iceland) Kristín Björk Jónsdóttir
- Foreign MVP: (United States) Jessica Gaspar

Statistical leaders
Points	(United States) Jessica Gaspar	24.1
Rebounds	(Iceland) Hafdís Helgadóttir	11.2
Assists	(United States) Jessica Gaspar	5.3

The 2000–01 Úrvalsdeild kvenna was the 43rd season of the Úrvalsdeild kvenna, the top tier women's basketball league in Iceland. The season started on October 14, 2000 and ended on March 31 10, 2001. KR won its twelfth title by defeating Keflavík 3–0 in the Finals.

== Competition format ==
The participating teams first played a conventional round-robin schedule with every team playing each opponent twice "home" and twice "away" for a total of 16 games. The top four teams qualified for the championship playoffs while none were relegated to Division I due to vacant berths.

== Regular season ==
Pos	Team	Pld	W	L	PF	PA	PD	Pts	Qualification or relegation
1	KR	16	12	4	1077	865	+212	24	Qualification to playoffs
2	Keflavík	16	11	5	1075	947	+128	22	Qualification to playoffs
3	KFÍ	16	10	6	1007	918	+89	20	Qualification to playoffs
4	ÍS	16	7	9	915	923	−8	14	Qualification to playoffs
5	Grindavík	16	0	16	789	1210	−421	0	Spared from relegation due to vacance berths

Source: Úrvalsdeild kvenna 2000–2001

== Playoffs ==
Semifinals
1	KR	2
4	ÍS	0
2	Keflavík	2
3	KFÍ	0

Finals
1	KR	3
2	Keflavík	0

Source: 2001 Úrvalsdeild kvenna playoffs
