= Kristen McCarthy =

American professional basketball player

Kristen Denise McCarthy
Personal information
- Born: February 28, 1990 (age 36) La Puente, California
- Listed height: 182 cm (6 ft 0 in)

Career information
- High school: Bishop Amat (La Puente, California)
- College: Temple (2008–2012)
- Playing career: 2012–2019
- Position: Guard
- Number: 5

Career history
- 2012: Romagna Faenza
- 2013: Tarbes Gespe Bigorre
- 2014–2015: Snæfell
- 2015: BC ICIM Arad
- 2015–2016: SV Halle Lions
- 2016–2017: Eisvögel USC Freiburg
- 2017–2019: Snæfell

Career highlights
- Úrvalsdeild Foreign Player of the Year (2015); Úrvalsdeild Playoffs MVP (2015); Icelandic league champion (2015); Icelandic Super Cup (2014); First-team All-A-10 (2010); A-10 All-Freshman Team (2009)

Kristen Denise McCarthy (born February 28, 1990, in La Puente, California) is an American former professional basketball player. She won the Icelandic championship with Snæfell in 2015 when she was also named the Úrvalsdeild Foreign Player of the Year and the Úrvalsdeild Playoffs MVP.

== College ==
McCarthy played basketball at Temple University from 2008 to 2012. She was a First Team All-Atlantic 10 Conference in 2010 and made the Second Team in 2011 and 2012. In total she scored 1604 points in 129 games for the school.

== Career ==
During the 2014–2015 season, McCarthy played for Snæfell in the Icelandic Úrvalsdeild where she helped the club win the Icelandic Super Cup and the Icelandic national championship. She finished second in the league in scoring, behind Lele Hardy, and was named both the Úrvalsdeild foreign player of the year and the playoffs MVP.

McCarthy's next stop was in Romania with BC ICIM Arad which played in the Liga Națională and the Central Europe Women's League. She was let out of her contract in December 2015 as the club was having financial difficulties and shortly later signed with SV Halle Lions of the Damen-Basketball-Bundesliga. After two seasons in Germany, McCarthy, a fan favorite at Snæfell, signed with the club again in July 2017.

On October 8, 2017, McCarthy scored 53 points in a victory against Skallagrímur in the Úrvalsdeild kvenna. She broke the 50 point barrier again on November 22, when she scored 50 points in a losing effort against defending champions Keflavík. On December 3, McCarthy had a quadruple-double in a victory against Njarðvík with 31 points, 15 rebounds, 12 steals and 10 assists. For the season she averaged 29.2 points, 13.4 rebounds and 4.1 assists.

In her first 12 games of the 2018–2019 season, McCarthy averaged 40.1 minutes per game, including a 50 minutes played in a double overtime game against Breiðablik. She missed the last three games of the season due to a concussion. Snæfell won the first two of those games but lost the last game of the season to Valur and therefore did not qualify for the playoffs. For the season she averaged 28.8 points, 14.0 rebounds, 6.0 assists and league leading 4.2 steals per game.

Owing to the severity of the concussion, McCarthy was expected to sit out the entire 2019–2020 season. Instead, the team had plans for her to join the coaching staff when she received a green light from doctors to fly.

== Personal life ==
In 2018, McCarthy applied for Icelandic citizenship.

== Statistics ==
=== College statistics ===
Legend
GP	Games played	GS	Games started	MPG	Minutes per game
FG%	Field goal percentage	3P%	3-point field goal percentage	FT%	Free throw percentage
RPG	Rebounds per game	APG	Assists per game	SPG	Steals per game
BPG	Blocks per game	PPG	Points per game	**Bold**	Career high

Year	Team	GP	Points	FG%	3P%	FT%	RPG	APG	SPG	BPG	PPG
2008–09	Temple	31	267	36.0%	31.3%	50.6%	4.3	1.5	1.6	0.2	8.6
2009–10	Temple	**34**	**502**	**41.3%**	**35.1%**	**73.0%**	6.0	1.6	1.4	**0.5**	**14.8**
2010–11	Temple	33	435	38.7%	31.9%	68.8%	4.8	1.8	**1.8**	0.2	13.2
2011–12	Temple	33	415	38.4%	23.7%	55.2%	**6.6**	**2.2**	1.5	0.3	12.6
Career		131	1619	38.9%	11.1%	62.7%	8.8	1.8	1.6	0.3	12.4

== Awards and accomplishments ==
=== Club Honours ===
==== France ====
- Challenge Round winner (2013)

==== Iceland ====
- Icelandic league champion (2015)
- Icelandic Super Cup (2014)

=== Individual honours ===
==== College ====
- First Team All-Atlantic 10 Conference (2010)
- Second Team All-Atlantic 10 Conference (2011, 2012)
- Philadelphia Big 5 Player of the Year (2010)

==== Iceland ====
- Úrvalsdeild Foreign Player of the Year (2015)
- Úrvalsdeild Playoffs MVP (2015)
