= Elín Sóley Hrafnkelsdóttir =

Icelandic basketball player (born 1998)

Personal information
- Born: 16 September 1998 (age 28)
- Listed height: 185 cm (6 ft 1 in)

Career information
- College: Tulsa (2018–2022)
- Playing career: 2013–present
- Position: Forward
- Number: 20

Career history
- 2013–2015: Breiðablik
- 2015: Hamar
- 2015–2016: Breiðablik
- 2016–2018: Valur
- 2022–2023: Valur

Career highlights
- Úrvalsdeild Domestic All-First Team (2018); Icelandic champion (2023); 1. deild kvenna (2014)

Elín Sóley Hrafnkelsdóttir (born 16 September 1998) is an Icelandic basketball player who last played for Valur of the Úrvalsdeild kvenna. She debuted for the Icelandic national basketball team in 2016.

== Playing career ==
Elín came up through the junior teams of Breiðablik and debuted with its senior team in the later part of the 2012–13 season where she averaged 8.0 points and 6.3 rebounds in three games. The following season she helped Breiðablik win the second-tier 1. deild kvenna and gain promotion to the Úrvalsdeild kvenna. She appeared in 27 games during the 2014–15 Úrvalsdeild season, averaging 5.6 points and 5.1 rebounds. The following season she signed with Hamar but left the team after two games and signed back with Breiðablik, this time in the 1. deild kvenna. In 17 games for Breiðablik, she averaged 11.9 points and 7.1 rebounds per game.

After the season, she signed with Valur. On 13 April 2018, she helped Valur reach the Úrvalsdeild finals, after posting 18 points and 12 rebounds in a series winning game against Keflavík. In the finals, Valur lost 2–3 to Haukar.

After the finals ended, Elín joined the University of Tulsa. During her stay there, she was named to the 2019, 2020 and 2021 American Athletic Conference All-Academic Teams. An injury in January 2021 forced her to miss the last nine games of her junior season and all of her senior season.

Following her graduation from Tulsa, Elín returned to Iceland and signed back with Valur in June 2022. In her first game back, she had 16 points and 4 rebounds in a victory against Breiðablik. In November it was announced that she would miss the rest of the season due to a torn cruciate ligament and meniscus. In seven games, she averaged 6.7 points and 5.4 rebounds.

On 28 April 2023, she won her first Icelandic championship after Valur defeated top-seeded Keflavík in the Úrvalsdeild finals, 3–1.

== National team career ==
Elín played her first games for the Icelandic national basketball team in 2016.
