= Ebony Dickinson =

American basketball player

Personal information
- Born: September 8, 1977 Detroit, Michigan, U.S.
- Died: September 29, 2009 (aged 32)
- Listed height: 178 cm (5 ft 10 in)

Career information
- High school: Murray-Wright (Detroit, Michigan)
- College: Lansing CC (1995–1997); St. John's (1997–1999)
- Position: Forward

Career history
- 1999–2000: KFÍ
- 2002: Njarðvík
- 2003: Grand Rapids Blizzard
- 2003–2004: Eskilstuna BBK

Career highlights
- Úrvalsdeild Foreign Player of the Year (2000); Úrvalsdeild scoring champion (2000); Úrvalsdeild rebounding leader (2000)

Ebony Jenise Dickinson (September 8, 1977 – September 29, 2009) was an American professional basketball player. After graduating from St. John's University in 1999 she went overseas and achieved success playing professional basketball in Iceland, Sweden, Greece and China.

== High school ==
Dickinson played high school basketball for Murray-Wright in her hometown of Detroit, Michigan where she graduated in 1995. During her senior season she averaged 22 points, 14 rebounds, seven steals and five assists per game, leading the Pilots to the PSL championship game, and was named Miss PSL by the Detroit Public School League Coaches Association.

== College ==
Dickinson begun her college career with Lansing Community College where she won the NJCAA division II championship along with the NJCAA Division II MVP award in 1996. In 1997 she moved to St. John's and played there until 1999, leading the team in scoring and rebounding for both seasons. In total, she scored 861 and grabbed 391 rebounds with averages of 14.8 points and 6.7 rebounds per game.

== Professional career ==
=== Iceland ===
For the 1999–2000 season, Dickinson joined newly promoted KFÍ in the Icelandic Úrvalsdeild. She went on to lead the league in scoring (32.2 ppg) and rebounding (18.7), and tied the then record for most points in a non-overtime game (52) while also break the record for most rebounds in a game (29), breaking her own record of 27 rebounds. For her efforts she was voted the Foreign player of the year. After the season she had a tryout with the Detroit Shock of the WNBA.

In 2002, she briefly joined Úrvalsdeild club Njarðvík for two games. The first game was against Grindavík where she had 27 points, 11 rebounds and 5 steals in a 75–60 win. The second game was against KR in the Icelandic Basketball Cup finals. Despite 27 points, 18 rebounds, 7 assists and 5 steals from Dickinson, Njarðvík lost the finals game in overtime, 81–74.

=== National Women's Basketball League ===
Dickinson spent the 2003 season with the Grand Rapids Blizzard in the National Women's Basketball League (NWBL).

=== Sweden ===
After the 2003 NWBL season, Dickinson signed with Eskilstuna BBK in the Swedish Basketligan. In 11 regular season games, she averaged 13.7 points and 9.4 rebounds.

== Career statistics ==
Year	Team	GP	GS	MPG	FG%	3P%	FT%	RPG	APG	SPG	BPG	TO	PPG
1997–98	St John's	27	-	-	32.2	22.7	67.1	6.0	2.5	1.9	0.2	-	13.1
1998–99	St John's	31	-	-	35.2	'29.3	64.4	7.4	2.9	1.9	0.1	-	16.4
Career		58	-	-	33.9	28.1	65.5	6.7	2.7	1.9	0.1	-	14.8
Statistics retrieved from Sports-Reference.

== Death ==
Dickinson died on September 29, 2009, at the age of 32, after battling breast cancer.

== Awards and achievements ==
Professional career

- Úrvalsdeild Foreign Player of the Year: 2000
- Úrvalsdeild scoring champion: 2000
- Úrvalsdeild rebounding leader: 2000

College career

- NJCAA division II championship: 1996
- NJCAA division II MVP: 1996
