= Guðrún Gróa Þorsteinsdóttir =

Icelandic basketball player and power lifter

Personal information
- Born: 21 January 1989 (age 37)
- Listed height: 178 cm (5 ft 10 in)

Career information
- Playing career: 2006–2017
- Position: Forward
- Number: 7, 8

Career history
- 2006–2011: KR
- 2012–2013: KR
- 2013–2014: Snæfell
- 2015–2017: KR

Career highlights
- Úrvalsdeild Domestic All-First Team (2014); 4x Úrvalsdeild Defensive Player of the Year (2009-2011, 2014); 2x Icelandic champion (2010, 2014); Icelandic Basketball Cup (2009); 2x Icelandic Supercup (2006, 2011)

Guðrún Gróa Þorsteinsdóttir (born 21 January 1989) is an Icelandic basketball player and a former power lifter. She won the Icelandic basketball championship two times, in 2010 and 2014, and the Icelandic Basketball Cup once. She was one of the Úrvalsdeild kvenna premier defenders during her career, being named the Úrvalsdeild Defensive Player of the Year four times.

== Playing career ==
Guðrún started her senior career with KR in 2006 and was a key player in the team's 2010 championship run. She left KR after the 2010–2011 season to focus on her powerlifting career. After one season away, Guðrún returned to KR in September 2012.

In June 2013, Guðrún left KR and joined Snæfell. For the season she averaged 10.4 points, 7.3 rebounds and 2.6 assists, and was named to the Úrvalsdeild Domestic All-First Team. She left Snæfell after the season, moving to Denmark.

Guðrún returned from Denmark in 2015 and signed with KR in 1. deild. She was named 1. deild's I Player of the Year and to the leagues Domestic All-First Team in 2016 after averaging 15.4 points and 13.3 rebounds for the season.

In April 2017, Guðrún signed with Valur but did not participate in any games during the 2017–2018 season. In 2019 she played for Kormákur in 2. deild kvenna.

== Personal life ==
Guðrún is the sister of track and field athlete Helga Margrét Þorsteinsdóttir.

== Awards, titles and accomplishments ==
=== Individual awards ===
- Úrvalsdeild Domestic All-First Team : 2014
- Úrvalsdeild Defensive Player of the Year (4): 2009–2011, 2014
- 1. deild Player of the Year : 2016
- 1. deild Domestic All-First Team : 2016

=== Titles ===
- Icelandic champion (2): 2010, 2014
- Icelandic Basketball Cup : 2009
- Icelandic Supercup (2): 2009, 2010
- Icelandic Company Cup: 2009

=== Accomplishments ===
- Icelandic All-star game: 2010
