= Jónína Þórdís Karlsdóttir =

Icelandic basketball player

No. 8 – Ármann
- Position: Point guard
- League: Úrvalsdeild kvenna

Personal information
- Born: 23 November 1999 (age 26)
- Listed height: 170 cm (5 ft 7 in)

Career information
- Playing career: 2015–2017, 2020–present

Career history
- 2015–2016: Valur
- 2016–2017: Stjarnan
- 2020–present: Ármann

Career highlights
- 3× 1. deild Domestic Player of the Year (2021, 2022, 2025); 4× 1. deild Domestic All-First Team (2021, 2022, 2024, 2025); 1. deild winner (2025); 4× 1. deild assist leader (2022–2025)

Jónína Þórdís Karlsdóttir (born 23 November 1999) is an Icelandic basketball player who plays for Ármann.

After playing for Valur and Stjarnan between 2015 and 2017 in Úrvalsdeild kvenna, she stepped away from basketball. In 2020, she was a key part of re-establishing the Ármann's senior women's team. During the 2020–2021 season, she averaged 20.2 points, 9.5 rebounds and 4.3 assists per game. In 2025, she guided the team to promotion to the Úrvalsdeild for the first time since 1960. Following the season, she was named the 1. deild domestic player of the year for the third time.

== National team career ==
Jónína played 26 games for Iceland's junior national teams between 2014 and 2017.
