= Úrvalsdeild Women's Foreign Player of the Year =

Icelandic basketball award

The Women's Foreign Player of the Year is an award for the top-tier basketball league in Iceland, the women's Úrvalsdeild.

== All-time award winners ==
The following is a list of the all-time Úrvalsdeild Women's Foreign Player of the Year winners.

Season	Player	Team
1995–1996	(United States) Betsy Harris	Breiðablik
1996–1997	Not selected	
1997–1998	(United States) Jennifer Boucek	Keflavík
1998–1999	(Israel) Limor Mizrachi	KR
1999–2000	(United States) Ebony Dickinson	KFÍ
2000–2001	(United States) Jessica Gaspar	KFÍ
2001–2002	(United States) Jessica Gaspar (2x)	Grindavík
2002–2003	(United States) Denise Shelton	Grindavík
2003–2004	(United States) Katie Wolfe	KR
2004–2005	(United States) Reshea Bristol	Keflavík
2005–2006	(United States) Megan Mahoney	Haukar
2006–2007	(United States) Tamara Bowie	Grindavík
2007–2008	(United States) TaKesha Watson	Keflavík
2008–2009	(North Macedonia) Slavica Dimovska	Haukar
2009–2010	(United States) Heather Ezell	Haukar
2010–2011	(United States) Jacquline Adamshick	Keflavík
2011–2012	(United States) Lele Hardy	Njarðvík
2012–2013	(United States) Lele Hardy (2x)	Njarðvík
2013–2014	(United States) Lele Hardy (3x)	Haukar
2014–2015	(United States) Kristen McCarthy	Snæfell
2015–2016	(United States) Haiden Denise Palmer	Snæfell
2016–2017	(United States) Ariana Moorer	Keflavík
2017–2018	(United States) Danielle Rodriguez	Stjarnan
2018–2019	(United States) Brittanny Dinkins	Keflavík
2019–2020	None selected after season was canceled due to the coronavirus pandemic in Iceland	
2020–2021	(Venezuela) Daniela Wallen	Keflavík
2021–2022	(United States) Aliyah Mazyck	Fjölnir
2022–2023	(Venezuela) Daniela Wallen (2x)	Keflavík

1. Penny Peppas and Ulrike Hettler were the only foreign players during the 1996-1997 season. Peppas became the first foreign born professional player in the Úrvalsdeild kvenna in 1994.
