= Dagbjört Dögg Karlsdóttir =

Icelandic basketball player

No. 9 – Valur
- Position: Point guard
- League: Úrvalsdeild kvenna

Personal information
- Born: 26 June 1999 (age 27)
- Listed height: 169 cm (5 ft 7 in)

Career information
- Playing career: 2012–present

Career history
- 2012–2013: Laugdælir
- 2015: KR
- 2015–present: Valur

Career highlights
- Úrvalsdeild Domestic All-First Team (2022); Úrvalsdeild Defensive Player of the Year (2021); Úrvalsdeild Young Player of the Year (2018); 3× Icelandic champion (2019, 2021, 2023); Icelandic Cup (2019); Icelandic Super Cup (2019)

Dagbjört Dögg Karlsdóttir is an Icelandic basketball player for Valur of the Úrvalsdeild kvenna and a member of the Icelandic national team. She won the Icelandic championship in 2019 and 2021 and the Icelandic Cup in 2019. In 2021, she was named the Úrvalsdeild Defensive Player of the Year and in 2022, she was named to the Úrvalsdeild Domestic All-First Team. In 2018, she was named the Úrvalsdeild Young Player of the Year.

On 28 April 2023, she won her third Icelandic championship after Valur defeated top-seeded Keflavík in the Úrvalsdeild finals, 3–1.

== Early life ==
Dagbjört grew up in Reykir in Hrútafjörður where she started playing basketball with Kormákur from Hvammstangi.

== National team career ==
After playing for Iceland's junior teams, Dagbjört debuted for the Icelandic senior national team in 2017.
