= Keira Robinson =

American basketball player (born 1994)

No. 8 – Nyon Basket Feminin
- Position: Point guard
- League: SB League

Personal information
- Born: December 20, 1994 (age 31) Columbia, South Carolina
- Listed height: 173 cm (5 ft 8 in)

Career information
- High school: W. J. Keenan (Columbia, South Carolina)
- College: VCU (2013–2017)
- Playing career: 2017–present

Career history
- 2017–2018: C.D. Magec Tías
- 2018: Tomás de Rocamora
- 2018–2019: UCAM Murcia CB
- 2019–2021: Skallagrímur
- 2021: UCAM Murcia CB
- 2021–2024: Haukar
- 2024: BC Minsk
- 2025: Nyon Basket Feminin

Career highlights
- Icelandic Cup Finals MVP (2020); 3× Icelandic Cup (2020, 2022, 2023); 2× Icelandic Super Cup (2020, 2023); A-10 All-Freshman Team (2014)

Keira Breeanne Robinson (born December 20, 1994) is an American professional basketball player. In 2020 she was named the Icelandic Cup Finals MVP after leading Skallagrímur to its first ever Icelandic Cup win.

== High school ==
Robinson played attended W. J. Keenan High School in Columbia, South Carolina. During her senior season, she averaged 20.1 points, 5.1 assists and 6.0 steals per game.

== College career ==
From 2013 to 2017, Robinson played college basketball for the VCU Rams. She was the second player in the schools history to reach 1,000 points, 400 assists and 200 steals.

== Professional career ==
After playing in Spain and Argentina, Robinson signed with Skallagrímur of the Icelandic Úrvalsdeild kvenna in September 2019. She starred during the final-four of the Icelandic Cup, scoring 44 points in the semi-finals against Haukar and 32 points in the finals against KR, leading Skallagrímur to its first ever win in the Cup. For her performance, she was named the Cup Finals MVP. In the Úrvalsdeild, she averaged 24.1 points, 8.6 rebounds and 5.2 assists per game and led Skallagrímur to a 4th place finish before the rest of the season was canceled in March 2020 due to the coronavirus pandemic in Iceland. A month later, she signed a re-signed with the club for the 2020–21 season.

On 20 September 2020, she won the Icelandic Super Cup after scoring a team high 21 points when Skallagrímur defeated Valur 74–68.

In 2021, she signed with Spanish club UCAM Murcia CB. She left the team in December 2021, after averaging 6.0 points, 4.0 assists and 2.1 assists in 14 league games, and returned to Iceland where she signed with Haukar, replacing the recently departed Haiden Palmer. In her debut, she shad 27 points and 9 rebounds in a victory against Breiðablik. On 19 March 2022, she won the Icelandic Cup for the second time after Haukar defeated Breiðablik in the 2022 Cup Finals. In April 2022, she signed a 2-year contract extension with the club.

On 14 January 2023, she posted 22 points, 12 rebounds and 5 assists in Haukar's 94–66 win against Keflavík in the Icelandic Cup final.

On 20 September 2023, Robinson scored a game high 19 points, including the game winning basket at the buzzer, in Haukar's 78-77 win against Valur in the Icelandic Super Cup.

After three seasons in Iceland, Robinson signed with BC Minsk in September 2024. At Minsk, she helped the team reach the Belarus Cup final. In January 2025, she signed with Nyon Basket Feminin of the SB League in Switzerland. In April, she helped Nyon reach the SBL League Finals.

== Statistics ==
=== College statistics ===
Legend
GP	Games played	GS	Games started	MPG	Minutes per game
FG%	Field goal percentage	3P%	3-point field goal percentage	FT%	Free throw percentage
RPG	Rebounds per game	APG	Assists per game	SPG	Steals per game
BPG	Blocks per game	PPG	Points per game	**Bold**	Career high

Year	Team	GP	Points	FG%	3P%	FT%	RPG	APG	SPG	BPG	PPG
2013–14	Virginia Commonwealth	32	**365**	**38.1%**	26.7%	68.1%	3.6	**6.3**	**2.2**	0.1	**11.4**
2014–15	Virginia Commonwealth	29	157	28.9%	**32.3%**	47.4%	3.0	1.9	1.6	0.2	5.4
2015–16	Virginia Commonwealth	**33**	246	33.6%	24.7%	71.6%	3.6	3.8	1.8	0.2	7.5
2016–17	Virginia Commonwealth	31	344	36.3%	30.4%	**80.0%**	**5.0**	3.0	2.1	**0.3**	11.1
Career		125	1112	35.0%	28.2%	69.4%	3.8	3.8	1.9	0.2	8.9
