= Fúsíjama BCI =

- Founded: 1999
- History: Fúsíjama BCI (1999–present)
- Arena: Ísjakinn (capacity: 900)
- Location: Hnífsdalur, Iceland
- Team colors: Black, red, white
- Website: Fúsíjama.net
Home	Away

Fúsíjama Basketball Club International is an Icelandic basketball team based in Hnífsdalur, Iceland. The team was founded on 15 October 1999 and is named after the highest mountain in Japan, Mount Fuji.

== Name ==
Because of a regulation of the Icelandic Athletic Federation regarding foreign names, the team could not compete in official games using the Fúsíjama name, instead going by the name Reynir Hnífsdal in all official games. However, it has usually been referred to by the Fúsíjama name in the media and by the Icelandic Basketball Federation (KKÍ).

== Head coaches ==
Managers since 1999:

- Guðni Þór Sigurjónsson
- Ágúst Ívar Vilhjálmsson
- Þórarinn Ólafsson
