= Jessica Gaspar =

American former professional basketball player

- Jessica Gaspar playing for KFÍ.

Personal information
- Born: December 7, 1976 (age 49)
- Listed height: 5 ft 6 in (1.68 m)
- Listed weight: 143 lb (65 kg)

Career information
- High school: Dartmouth (Dartmouth, Massachusetts)
- College: North Carolina (1995–1999)
- Playing career: 2000–2002
- Position: Point guard

Career history

Playing
- 2000–2001: KFÍ
- 2001–2002: Grindavík

Coaching
- 2004–2005: UNC Wilmington (assistant)

Career highlights
- 2x Úrvalsdeild Foreign Player of the Year (2001, 2002); Icelandic Basketball Cup (2002); Úrvalsdeild scoring champion (2001); Úrvalsdeild assists leader (2001); Úrvalsdeild rebounding leader (2002); 2× Úrvalsdeild steals leader (2001, 2002)

Career Úrvalsdeild kvenna statistics
- Points: 623 (23.1 ppg)
- Rebounds: 311 (11.5 rpg)
- Assists: 155 (5.3 apg)

Jessica Gaspar (born December 7, 1976) is an American former basketball player. She played college basketball for the University of North Carolina in and later professionally in Iceland where she won multiple awards and accolades.

== Playing career ==
=== High school career ===
Gasper attended Dartmouth High School where she played basketball and was a four-time Eastern Athletic League All-Star. She averaged 26.4 points during her senior season. During the post-season, she averaged 31.2 points per game. During her four years at Dartmouth, the team compiled an overall record of 71 wins in 80 games.

=== College career ===
Gaspar played with the North Carolina Tar Heels from 1995–1999, winning the ACC twice and advancing to the NCAA tournament three times (1997, 1998, 1999). During the second round of the 1997 NCAA tournament, as the Tar Heels where eliminating Michigan State, Gaspar tore her ACL in her left knee while driving to the basket.

=== Professional career ===
Gaspar joined KFÍ in the Icelandic Úrvalsdeild kvenna for the 2000–01 season. She broke the Úrvalsdeild single game assist record on November 24, 2000, when she had 17 assists against Grindavík, and led the team to a 10-6 record, securing third place and their first ever playoff appearance. Despite averaging 19.5 points and 13.5 rebounds, KFÍ got swept by Keflavík in the semi-finals. Gaspar led the league in scoring (24.1 ppg), assists (5.3 apg) and steals (5.1 spg) while coming second in rebounds (10.0 rpg). For her efforts she was voted the Foreign player of the year.

Gaspar joined UMFG for the 2001–02 season and won the Icelandic Cup with them after defeating Keflavík in the finals, 82-58. After averaging 21.5 points in the first 11 league games, she sustained a partial tear in the anterior cruciate ligament in her left knee in January, the same ACL she had surgically repaired at the end of her sophomore season at UNC in 1997, and missed the rest of the season. Despite the injury, she led the league in rebounds with 13.7 rebounds per game, set a league record for steals with 7.2 per game and was once again voted the Foreign player of the year. Due to the ACL injury, she retired from professional basketball following the season.

== Coaching career ==
Gaspar served as an assistant coach to Ann Hancock at UNC Wilmington during the 2004–2005 season.

== Titles, awards and achievements ==
=== Titles ===
- ACC champion: 1997, 1998
- Icelandic Basketball Cup: 2002

=== Awards ===
- Úrvalsdeild Foreign Player of the Year: 2001, 2002

=== Achievements ===
- Úrvalsdeild scoring champion: 2001
- Úrvalsdeild assists leader: 2001
- Úrvalsdeild rebounding leader: 2002
- Úrvalsdeild steals leader: 2001, 2002

== Film ==
Gaspar appeared in the 2002 comedy film Juwanna Mann which starred Miguel A. Núñez Jr., Vivica A. Fox and Kim Wayans.
