= Gréta María Grétarsdóttir =

Icelandic businesswoman and basketball player/coach

Personal information
- Born: 13 August 1980 (age 46)

Career information
- Playing career: 1993–2015
- Coaching career: 2003–2008

Career history

Playing
- 1993–1996: ÍR
- 1997–1999: ÍR
- 1999–2005: KR
- 2007–2010: Fjölnir
- 2012–2013: Fjölnir-b
- 2014–2015: Fjölnir

Coaching
- 2003–2005: KR
- 2007–2008: Fjölnir

Career highlights
- As player: 2× Icelandic champion (2001, 2002); 2× Icelandic Basketball Cup (2001, 2002); Icelandic Supercup (1999); Icelandic Company Cup (2000); 1. deild kvenna champion (2010); Úrvalsdeild Young Player of the Year (1994); 1. deild Domestic MVP (2010); 1. deild Domestic All-First team (2010); As coach: Úrvalsdeild Coach of the Year (2004)

Career coaching record
- Úrvalsdeild kvenna: 15–45 (.250)

Gréta María Grétarsdóttir (born 13 August 1980) is an Icelandic businesswoman and former basketball player and coach. During her basketball career, she had her most success with KR, winning two national championships and two Icelandic Cups. During her peak, she was a member of the Icelandic national basketball team.

== Early life ==
Gréta grew up in Flateyri before moving with her family to Reykjavík.

== Basketball career ==
Gréta started her senior team career with ÍR during the 1993–94 season. After the season she was named the Young Player of the Year. She later moved to KR where she won the national championship and the Icelandic Cup in 2001 and 2002. After being ruled out for 2003–2004 season after tearing her posterior cruciate ligament in the 2003 playoffs, she was hired as the head coach of the team. She was named the Úrvalsdeild Coach of the Year after leading KR to the Úrvalsdeild finals.

In 2010, she was named the 1. deild Domestic MVP after leading Fjölnir to victory in the league and promotion to the Úrvalsdeild kvenna.

=== National team career ===
Gréta played for the Icelandic national basketball team from 1998 to 2000, appearing in 15 games.

== Business career ==
In 2016, Gréta was hired as the chief financial officer of Festi, a major retail company in Iceland. In September 2018, she took over as the chief executive officer of Krónan, a discount supermarket chain and a subsidiary company of Festi. In December 2019, she received the Icelandic Business Award after Krónan had its largest operating year in the history of the company. In May 2020, Gréta resigned from the company, siding her unhappiness with the board of Festi applying for and receiving substantial financial relief from the Icelandic government, due to the coronavirus pandemic, despite the profits for the year being projected in billions of ISK.

In June 2020, Gréta was appointed by Kristján Þór Júlíusson, the Minister of Fisheries and Agriculture, as the chairman of the board of the Icelandic Food Fund.

In 2024, she became the CEO of Prís, a supermarket chain owned by the former owners of Bónus supermarket chain. In December 2025, she resigned from the company.
