= Danielle Rodriguez =

American and Icelandic basketball player (born 1993)

Njarðvík
- Position: Point guard
- League: Úrvalsdeild kvenna

Personal information
- Born: December 18, 1993 (age 32)
- Listed height: 180 cm (5 ft 11 in)
- Listed weight: 70 kg (154 lb)

Career information
- High school: Warren (Downey, California)
- College: Utah (2012–2016)
- Playing career: 2016–2020; 2022–present
- Number: 4, 22
- Coaching career: 2018–present

Career history

Playing
- 2016–2019: Stjarnan
- 2019–2020: KR
- 2022–2024: Grindavík
- 2024–2025: Elfic Fribourg
- 2025–present: Njarðvík

Coaching
- 2018–2019: Stjarnan (women's, assistant)
- 2018–2019: Iceland U-20 (women's, assistant)
- 2019–2021: Stjarnan (men's, assistant)
- 2020–2021: Iceland (women's assistant)
- 2020–2021: Stjarnan (women's, assistant)
- 2021–2022: San Diego (assistant)
- 2022–2023: Iceland U-16 (women's)

Career highlights
- As player: Úrvalsdeild Domestic Player of the Year (2026); Úrvalsdeild Foreign Player of the Year (2018); Úrvalsdeild Playoffs MVP (2026); Úrvalsdeild Domestic All-First team (2026); Icelandic champion (2026); 2×Icelandic Super Cup (2025, 2026); 2× Úrvalsdeild assist leader (2017, 2019); As assistant coach: Icelandic Men's Super Cup (2020)

Danielle Victoria Rodriguez (born December 18, 1993) is an American and Icelandic basketball player and coach. She currently plays for Njarðvík in the Úrvalsdeild kvenna. After graduating from the University of Utah, she went on to play professionally in the Úrvalsdeild kvenna where she was named the Foreign Player of the Year in 2018 and led the league in assists in 2017 and 2019. A naturalized Icelandic citizen, she debuted for the Icelandic national team in 2024. In 2026, she was named the Úrvalsdeild Domestic Player of the Year, the same year she won the Icelandic championship for the first time and was named the Playoffs MVP.

Alongside her playing career, she has served as an assistant coach, including for the University of San Diego and the Icelandic junior national teams program. In 2020, she became the first woman to serve as a coach in the top-tier Icelandic men's league, Úrvalsdeild karla.

== High school career ==
Rodriguez attended Warren High School in Downey, California, where she was a three-timea league MVP. During her senior season, she averaged 17.9 points, 6.2 assists, 4.8 rebounds and 2.6 steals per game. While at Warren, she also competed in cross country, track and volleyball.

=== College career ===
Rodriguez played college basketball for the University of Utah from 2012 to 2016, starting 128 of 129 games. During her senior season, she averaged career highs of 9.6 points along with 4.1 assists and 3.6 rebounds and was a Pac-12 All-Defensive Team Honorable Mention. She left the school with averages of 7.0 points, 3.7 rebounds and 3.5 assists.

=== Club career ===
==== Stjarnan ====
After graduating, she signed with Stjarnan in 2016. She had a standout season, averaging 23.4 points, 9.6 rebounds and league leading 5.9 assists during the regular season and leading Stjarnan to the playoffs. In the playoffs, Stjarnan were beaten in the first round by Snæfell.

She returned to Stjarnan the following season and continued her strong play. On January 21, 2018, Rodriguez had a triple-double, her third of the season, with 29 points, 19 rebounds and 17 assists in an 86–64 victory against Njarðvík. Despite her stellar play, Stjarnan missed out on the playoffs with a loss against Skallagrímur in the last game of the regular season. For the season she averaged 29.1 points, 11.5 rebounds and 8.8 assists and was named the Úrvalsdeild Foreign Player of the Year.

In June 2018, Rodriguez re-signed with Stjarnan for the 2018–2019 season. On October 31, she was one steal away from a quadruple-double in a victory against Valur. She finished the game with 23 points, 12 rebounds, 13 assists and 9 steals. On 16 January 2019, Rodriguez had 27 points, 15 rebounds and 13 assists, her fifth triple-double of the season, in an overtime victory against first-place KR. On 13 February, Rodriguez scored 33 points, including a three-point heave from just inside the half-court line to finish the first half, in Stjarnan's 103–82 win over Breiðablik in the Icelandic Cup semi-finals, propelling Stjarnan to the Cup finals for the first time in its history. She also helped Stjarnan reach the Úrvalsdeild playoffs for the first time where it eventually bowed out against Keflavík in the semi-finals.

==== KR ====
After Stjarnan withdrew the team from the Úrvalsdeild in June 2019, Rodriguez signed with KR. On 13 February 2020 she had 31 points and 11 assists in an overtime victory against defending cup and national champions Valur in the Icelandic Cup final four.

On 15 May 2020, Rodriguez announced that she was retiring from playing professionally to fully focus on her coaching career.

==== Grindavík ====
On 4 April 2022, Rodriguez resumed her playing career after a two-year hiatus and signed with Grindavík. For the season, she averaged 20.0 points, 7.1 rebounds and 6.6 assists per game while Grindavík finished in fifth place and missed the playoffs. On 14 April, she signed a one-year contract extension with Grindavík.

==== BCF Elfic Fribourg ====
In June 2024, Rodriguez signed with BCF Elfic Fribourg Basket of the SB League Women and EuroCup Women.

==== Njarðvík ====
In May 2025, she returned to Iceland and signed with Njarðvík. On 27 September 2025, she won the Icelandic Super Cup with Njarðvík. In March 2026, she was named the Úrvalsdeild Domestic Player of the Year.

On 17 May 2026, she won the Icelandic championship for the first time and was named the Playoffs MVP.

On 26 September 2026, she won her second straight Super Cup win after Njarðvík defeated Keflavík 83–78.

=== National team career ===
In November 2024, Rodriguez was selected to play for the Icelandic national team for the first time. In her debut on 7 November, Rodriguez scored 29 points in a 70–78 loss against Slovakia in the EuroBasket Women 2025 qualification. Three days later, she scored 25 points in a 77–73 win against Romania, including the game winning basket and a free throw with 6.7 seconds left.

=== Statistics ===
==== College statistics ====
Legend
| GP | Games played | GS | Games started | MPG | Minutes per game |
| FG% | Field goal percentage | 3P% | 3-point field goal percentage | FT% | Free throw percentage |
| RPG | Rebounds per game | APG | Assists per game | SPG | Steals per game |
| BPG | Blocks per game | PPG | Points per game | **Bold** | Career high |

| Year | Team | GP | Points | FG% | 3P% | FT% | RPG | APG | SPG | BPG | PPG |
|---|---|---|---|---|---|---|---|---|---|---|---|
| 2012–13 | Utah | **36** | 94 | 37.8% | 38.2% | 57.6% | 3.1 | 2.2 | 0.6 | 0.4 | 2.6 |
| 2013–14 | Utah | 31 | 241 | 36.9% | **43.3%** | 64.8% | 3.8 | **4.3** | 0.9 | 0.6 | 7.8 |
| 2014–15 | Utah | 29 | 249 | 38.8% | 35.9% | 59.5% | **4.4** | 3.6 | 1.0 | **0.9** | 8.6 |
| 2015–16 | Utah | 33 | **318** | **43.2%** | 20.4% | **70.5%** | 3.6 | 4.1 | **1.3** | 0.4 | **9.6** |
| Career | | 129 | 902 | 39.7% | 33.3% | 64.2% | 3.7 | 3.5 | 0.9 | 0.6 | 7.0 |

== Coaching career ==
On December 1, 2018, the Icelandic Basketball Federation announced that it had hired Rodriguez as an assistant coach to the Icelandic women's national under-20 basketball team.

In May 2020, Rodriguez was hired as an assistant coach to Stjarnan men's basketball team and became the first woman to serve as a coach in the Icelandic top-tier Úrvalsdeild karla.

In August 2020, Rodriguez was hired as an assistant coach to the Icelandic women's national basketball team.

On 27 September 2020, she won her first medal as a coach when Stjarnan defeated Grindavík in the Icelandic Super Cup.

In August 2021, Rodriguez was named an assistant coach with University of San Diego women's basketball team.

== Personal life ==
In Decemenber 2023 it was announced that she was one of 20 individuals that were recommended for an Icelandic citizenship by Alþingi. On 16 December, her citizenship was approved by a parliament vote.
