= Fimleikafélagið Björk =

Sports club in Hafnarfjörður, Iceland

- Full name: Fimleikafélagið Björk
- Short name: Björk
- Sports: Basketball (formerly); Climbing; Gymnastics; Taekwondo
- Founded: 1 July 1951; 75 years ago
- Based in: Hafnarfjörður
- Home ground: Bjarkarhús
- Website: fbjork.is

Fimleikafélagið Björk, also known as Björk for short, is a multi-sports club from Hafnarfjörður, Iceland. The club was founded in 1951 as a gymnastics club but soon started departments in various other sports.

== Arena ==
In April 2001, ground was broken for the club's new arena, Bjarkarhús.

== Sports ==
=== Basketball ===
During the winter of 1958–1959, the club started a basketball department. The following winter, basketball was the main sport at the club, with the gymnastic department folding. In 1963, the club won a junior women's national championship in 2. flokkur kvenna. In 1964, the club competed in the top-tier of the Icelandic women's basketball tournament for the first and only time, finishing third.
