= Rebekka Rut Steingrímsdóttir =

Icelandic basketball player

No. 17 – KR
- Position: Guard
- League: Úrvalsdeild kvenna

Personal information
- Born: 5 August 2008 (age 18)
- Listed height: 174 cm (5 ft 9 in)

Career information
- Playing career: 2023–present

Career history
- 2023–present: KR

Career highlights
- Úrvalsdeild Domestic All-First Team (2026); Úrvalsdeild Young Player of the Year (2026); 1. deild Domestic All-First team (2025); 1. deild Defense Player of the Year (2025)

Rebekka Rut Steingrímsdóttir (born 5 August 2008) is an Icelandic basketball player for Úrvalsdeild kvenna club KR and the Icelandic national team.

== Club career ==
Rebekka started her senior team career with KR in 2023 in the second-tier 1. deild kvenna. During the 2024–2025 season, she averaged 15.9 points, 6,2 rebounds and 4.6 assists during the regular season, and was named to the Domestic All-First team and as the Defense player of the Year. During the promotion playoffs, she averaged 20.8 points, helping KR gain promotion to the top-tier Úrvalsdeild kvenna.

In her first season in the Úrvalsdeild, Rebekka averaged 15.4 points, along with 4.9 rebounds and 3.0 assists, helping KR to the third best record in the league. For her performance, she was named Young Player of the Year and to the Úrvalsdeild Domestic All-First Team.

== National team career ==
In November 2025, Rebekka was selected to the Icelandic national team for the first time. She debuted for the team on 12 November in a loss against Serbia, where she had 7 points and 5 assists.
