= Diljá Ögn Lárusdóttir =

Icelandic basketball player

No. 4 – Stjarnan
- Position: Guard
- League: Úrvalsdeild kvenna

Personal information
- Born: 23 June 2003 (age 23)

Career information
- Playing career: 2019–present

Career history
- 2019–2021: Fjölnir
- 2020–2021: → Fjölnir-b
- 2021–present: Stjarnan

Career highlights
- 1. deild Domestic MVP (2023); 2× 1. deild Domestic First Team (2022, 2023); 1. deild Young Player of The Year (2022); 1. deild kvenna winner (2023)

Diljá Ögn Lárusdóttir (born 23 June 2003) is an Icelandic basketball player for Stjarnan and the Icelandic national team.

== Club career ==
Diljá started her senior team career with Fjölnir in 2019. She split the following season with Fjölnir in the top-tier Úrvalsdeild kvenna and its reserve team, Fjölnir-b, in the second-tier 1. deild kvenna. In the 1. deild, she averaged 12.1 points during the 2020–2021 season.

After the season, she joined Stjarnan where she went on to average 26.0 points in the 1. deild during the 2021–2022 season. During the 2022–2023 season, she was named the 1. deild Domestic MVP after averaging 22.8 points per game for Stjarnan and helping the team gain promotion to the Úrvalsdeild kvenna.

During the summer of 2023, Diljá suffered a knee injury that forced her to miss all of the 2023–2024 season.

She returned to the court for the 2024–2025 season and scored 14 points in a win against reigning national champions Keflavík.

== National team career ==
In 2023, Diljá debuted with the Icelandic national team. On 12 February 2023, she scored a team high 14 points in a loss against Spain.

== Personal life ==
Diljá is the daughter of Lárus Mikael Knudsen Daníelsson, a multiple national champion in boxing and former basketball player for KFÍ.
