= Sóllilja Bjarnadóttir =

Icelandic basketball player (born 1995)

Grindavík
- Position: Guard
- League: Úrvalsdeild kvenna

Personal information
- Born: 13 February 1995 (age 30)
- Listed height: 173 cm (5 ft 8 in)
- Listed weight: 65 kg (143 lb)

Career information
- Playing career: 2010–present

Career history
- 2010-2011: → Stjarnan
- 2011–2012: Breiðablik
- 2013–2016: Valur
- 2013: → Stjarnan
- 2016–2019: Breiðablik
- 2019–2020: KR
- 2020–2021: Breiðablik
- 2021–2022: A3 Basket Umeå
- 2022–2023: Breiðablik
- 2024–present: Grindavík

Career highlights
- 1. deild kvenna Domestic MVP (2017); 1. deild kvenna Domestic All-First team (2017)

Sóllilja Bjarnadóttir (born 13 February 1995) is an Icelandic basketball player who plays for Njarðvík in the Icelandic top-tier Úrvalsdeild kvenna. Outside of Njarðvík, she has played with Breiðablik, Stjarnan, Valur and KR in Iceland. She played professionally for A3 Basket Umeå in the Basketligan dam during the 2021–2022 season.

On 24 February 2021, Sóllilja scored 28 points, including 17 points in a row, for Breiðablik in a victory against KR. She played for Breiðablik until December 2023 when the team folded.

In June 2024, Sóllilja signed with Grindavík.

== National team career ==
Sóllilja played 6 games for the Iceland national team from 2016 to 2019.
