= 2019–20 Icelandic Women's Basketball Cup =

2019–2020 Bikarkeppni Kvenna
Tournament details
- Arena: Laugardalshöll; Reykjavík
- Dates: 13–15 February 2020

Final positions
- Champions: Skallagrímur
- Runners-up: KR

Awards and statistics
- MVP: (United States) Keira Robinson
- Top scorer(s): (United States) Keira Robinson

The 2019–2020 Bikarkeppni kvenna, referred to as Geysisbikarinn for sponsorship reasons, was the 46th edition of the Icelandic Women's Basketball Cup, won by Skallagrímur against KR. The competition is managed by the Icelandic Basketball Federation and the final four was held in the Laugardalshöll in Reykjavík during the days of 13–15 February 2020. Keira Robinson was named the Cup Finals MVP after turning in 32 points and 11 rebounds. She led all scorers in the competition with 97 points in 3 games.

== Participating teams ==
Twelve teams signed up for the Cup tournament.

== Cup Finals MVP ==
Pos.	Player	Team
PG	(United States) Keira Robinson	Skallagrímur
