= Grand Rapids Blizzard =

American women's basketball team

- Grand Rapids Blizzard logo
- Sport: Basketball
- Founded: 2003
- Folded: 2003
- League: National Women's Basketball League
- Based in: Grand Rapids, Michigan
- Colors: Sky Blue and White
- Owner: Angela Chapman
- Head coach: Ozell Wells
- Championships: 0

The Grand Rapids Blizzard were a women's professional basketball team in the National Women's Basketball League (NWBL). Based in Grand Rapids, Michigan, they played in 2003.
