= Laufey Ámundadóttir =

Icelandic cell biologist and geneticist

Laufey Thóra Ámundadóttir
- Laufey Þóra Ámundadóttir
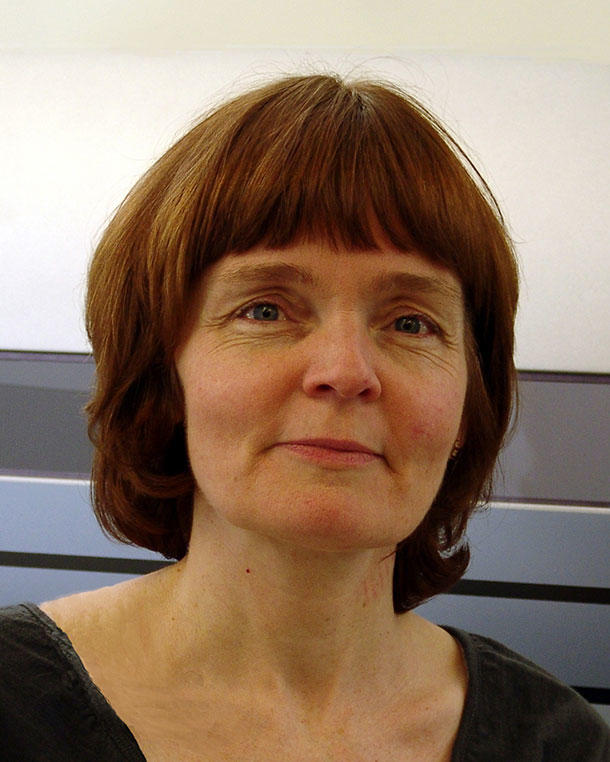
- Born: 1962 (age 63–64)
- Education: Georgetown University
- Scientific career
- Fields: Cell biology, cancer genetics
- Workplaces: National Cancer Institute
- Doctoral advisor: Robert B. Dickson

Laufey Thóra Ámundadóttir (Icelandic spelling: Laufey Þóra Ámundadóttir; born 1962) is an Icelandic cell biologist and geneticist who researches pancreatic cancer. She is a senior investigator in the laboratory of translational genomics at the National Cancer Institute. She was head of the division of cancer genetics at deCODE genetics from 1998 to 2007.

== Life ==
Ámundadóttir received a Ph.D. in cell biology in 1995 from Georgetown University. Her dissertation was titled The interaction of TGF [alpha] with C-MYC and NEU in mouse mammary and salivary gland tumorigenesis. Robert B. Dickson was her doctoral advisor. She conducted her postdoctoral training in the department of genetics at Harvard Medical School. She joined deCODE Genetics in 1998 as head of the division of cancer genetics, where she led genome-wide linkage and association efforts in various cancers. Ámundadóttir joined the National Cancer Institute (NCI) in 2007 and became a tenure-track investigator in the laboratory of translational genomics (LTG) in 2008. She was awarded scientific tenure by the National Institutes of Health (NIH) and appointed senior investigator in 2017. She leads genetic, genomic and molecular biology studies that collectively aim at better understanding inherited predisposition to pancreatic cancer, and the molecular mechanisms that underlie risk.
