= 1964 Úrvalsdeild kvenna (basketball) =

Íslandsmót kvenna^{1}
- Duration: 29 February 1964 – 1 March 1964
- Games played: 3
- Teams: 3

Finals
- Champions: Skallagrímur (1st title)
- Runners-up: ÍR

Statistical leaders
Points	(Iceland) Sigrún Kristjánsdóttir	12.5
- ^{1} The league changed its name to Úrvalsdeild kvenna in 2007.

The 1964 Icelandic women's national basketball tournament was the 9th season of the women's tournament in Iceland. The games were played during the weekend 29 February 1964 to 1 March 1964. Skallagrímur won its first title after defeating both Fimleikafélagið Björk and reigning champions Íþróttafélag Reykjavíkur in the tournament.

== Competition format ==
The participating teams played each opponent once for a total of two games. The team with the best record was crowned national champions.

== Game results ==
29 February 1964

Skallagrímur	18–9	Fimleikafélagið Björk
Pts: Sigrún Kristjánsdóttir 8

Reykjavík

29 February 1964

Fimleikafélagið Björk	vs.	ÍR
Pts: ?		Pts: ?

Reykjavík

1 March 1964

Skallagrímur	23–22	ÍR
Scoring by half: 11–10, 12–12
Pts: Sigrún Kristjánsdóttir 17

Reykjavík

== Regular season ==
Pos	Team	Pld	W	L	PF	PA	PD	Pts	Qualification or relegation
1	Skallagrímur	2	2	0	41	31	+10	4	Champions
2	ÍR	2	1	1	0	0	0	2	
3	Fimleikafélagið Björk	2	0	2	0	0	0	0	

Source: UMF. Skallagrímur Íslandsmeistari
