= Vítor Hugo Cup =

The Vítor Hugo Cup (Portuguese: Taça Vítor Hugo) is a basketball competition organized by the Portuguese Basketball Federation.

== Taça Vítor Hugo winners ==
Season	Final
Season	Winners	Result	Runners-up
2007–08	CAB Madeira	64–44	GD Escola Sec. de Santo André
2008–09	CAB Madeira	57–51	CJ Boa Viagem
2009–10	AD Vagos	61–50	CAB Madeira
2010–11	AD Vagos	89–81	M-Cell Algés
2011–12	AD Vagos	67–54	M-Cell Algés
2012–13	AD Vagos	65–61	M-Cell Algés
2013–14	CR Quinta dos Lombos	83–60	Olivais FC
2014–15	CR Quinta dos Lombos	74–66	AD Vagos
2015–16	Clube União Sportiva	78–76	CR Quinta dos Lombos
2016–17	CAB Madeira	58–41	AD Vagos
2017–18	AD Vagos	59–56	Clube União Sportiva
2018–19	Clube União Sportiva	60–48	GDESSA
2019–20	Benfica	64–38	AD Vagos
