= Heather Butler (basketball) =

American basketball player

Personal information
- Born: November 7, 1991 (age 35)
- Listed height: 5 ft 5 in (1.65 m)
- Listed weight: 128 lb (58 kg)

Career information
- High school: Gibson County (Dyer, Tennessee)
- College: Tennessee-Martin (2010–2014)
- Playing career: 2014–present
- Position: Guard
- Number: 11, 12

Career history

Playing
- 2014: San Antonio Stars
- 2014–2015: MKK Siedlce
- 2017–2018: Uppsala Basket
- 2018–2019: Valur

Coaching
- 2015–2016: Tennessee-Martin (assistant)

Career highlights
- As player: Icelandic champion (2019); Icelandic Cup winner (2019); OVC Player of the Year (2014); OVC Tournament MVP(2012); 4x First-team All-OVC (2011–2014); OVC Freshman of the Year (2011); OVC All-Freshman Team (2011)
- Stats at Basketball Reference

Heather Butler (born November 7, 1993) is an American professional basketball player and coach. In 2019, she won the Icelandic championship and the Icelandic Cup with Valur. She previously played in the WNBA for the San Antonio Stars.

== College career ==
Butler played college basketball for Tennessee-Martin, helping the school to four Ohio Valley Conference titles. She finished her career as the top scorer in UT Martin and Ohio Valley Conference history with 2,865 points which ranked 16th on the NCAA's all-time leaderboard. She was named the 2014 OVC Player of the Year, and ranked ninth in the country in scoring with 23.6 points per game. She scored in double figures in 129 consecutive games, every game of her career, ranking as the second longest streak in NCAA history, and tied a then NCAA three-point record with 392 career three-pointers made.

In 2014, Butler was inducted into the Tennessee Sports Hall of Fame.

== Career statistics ==
Legend
GP	Games played	GS	Games started	MPG	Minutes per game	RPG	Rebounds per game
APG	Assists per game	SPG	Steals per game	BPG	Blocks per game	PPG	Points per game
TO	Turnovers per game	FG%	Field-goal percentage	3P%	3-point field-goal percentage	FT%	Free-throw percentage
**Bold**	Career best	°	League leader

=== WNBA ===
==== Regular season ====
Year	Team	GP	GS	MPG	FG%	3P%	FT%	RPG	APG	SPG	BPG	TO	PPG
2014	San Antonio	11	0	3.5	11.1	16.7	75.0	0.3	0.3	0.0	0.0	0.5	0.5
Career	1 year, 1 team	11	0	3.5	11.1	16.7	75.0	0.3	0.3	0.0	0.0	0.5	0.5

=== College ===
Legend
GP	Games played	GS	Games started	MPG	Minutes per game
FG%	Field goal percentage	3P%	3-point field goal percentage	FT%	Free throw percentage
RPG	Rebounds per game	APG	Assists per game	SPG	Steals per game
BPG	Blocks per game	PPG	Points per game	**Bold**	Career high

Year	Team	GP	Points	FG%	3P%	FT%	RPG	APG	SPG	BPG	PPG
2010-11	UT Martin	31	589	40.4%	35.0%	78.7%	2.9	3.7	1.0	0.1	19.0
2011-12	UT Martin	32	760	**42.6%**	**42.3%**	81.1%	**4.2**	3.3	1.3	0.1	**23.8**
2012-13	UT Martin	**34**	**762**	35.4%	32.9%	78.3%	3.7	**4.0**	1.4	**0.1**	22.4
2013-14	UT Martin	32	754	41.0%	37.0%	**84.4%**	3.9	3.4	**1.5**	0.1	23.6
Career		129	2865	39.6%	36.5%	80.7%	3.7	3.6	1.3	0.1	22.2

== Professional career ==
After going undrafted in the 2014 WNBA draft, Butler signed a training camp contract with the San Antonio Stars. She went on to appear in 11 games for the Stars during the 2014 season. In July 2014, Butler signed Polish club MKK Siedlce.

In 2016, Butler participated in the Connecticut Sun training camp.

She joined Uppsala Basket of the Swedish Basketligan dam in January 2017 where she went on to average 21.7 points in 14 games. She returned to Uppsala for the 2017–2018 season and averaged 21.9 points and 5.1 assists per game in 22 games.

In November 2018, Butler signed with Valur of the Icelandic Úrvalsdeild kvenna, replacing Brooke Johnson. On 16 February 2019, she won the Icelandic Cup after Valur defeated Stjarnan in the Cup finals, 74–90. In the game, Butler had 15 points and 8 assists. On 27 April 2019, she helped Valur win its first ever national championship after beating Keflavík in the Úrvalsdeild finals 3-0. In 29 regular season and playoffs games, Butler averaged 21.9 points, 4.9 rebounds and 4.4 assists per game.

== Coaching career ==
In 2015, Butler was hired as an assistant coach at Tennessee-Martin.
