= Íþróttarhúsið á Torfnesi =

Indoor arena in Ísafjörður, Iceland

- "Jakinn, Ísjakinn, The Iceberg"
- Interactive map of Íþróttarhúsið á Torfnesi
- Location: Ísafjörður, Iceland
- Coordinates: 66.07349°N 23.13372°W
- Owner: Ísafjarðarbær
- Operator: Ísafjarðarbær
- Capacity: Basketball and Volleyball: 900

Construction
- Groundbreaking: 1988
- Opened: 18 September 1993
- Architect: Vilhjálmur Hjálmarsson

Tenants
- KFÍ (Basketball) (1993–2016); Vestri (Basketball) (2016–present); Fúsíjama BCI (Basketball) (1999–2006); Hörður (Handball); Skellur (Volleyball); Vestri (Volleyball) (2016–present)

Íþróttarhúsið á Torfnesi (Icelandic pronunciation: [ˈiːˌθrouhtarˌhuːsɪð au ˈtʰɔrvˌnɛːsɪ], lit. 'The Sports Hall in Torfnes'), known colloquially as Jakinn [ˈjaːcɪn] or Ísjakinn [ˈiːsˌjaːcɪn] (English: The Iceberg), is a multi-purpose indoor arena in Ísafjörður, Iceland. It is the homecourt to Íþróttafélagið Vestri (basketball and volleyball) and Knattspyrnufélagið Hörður (handball) but also hosts several other events every year.

== History ==
Groundbreaking took place in the spring of 1988 and the arena officially opened on 18 September 1993. The first game played was an exhibition game in basketball between reigning national champions of Njarðvík and KFÍ which included guest players John Rhodes, Frank Booker, Birgir Örn Birgisson and former NBA player Pétur Guðmundsson.

== National team games ==
The Icelandic men's national handball team has played three games in the building since its opening, all victories. Its first official game there was a 23–18 victory against Japan on 13 April 1995. In 1997 it defeated China 27-24 and in 2014 it defeated Portugal 33–28.

The Icelandic men's national basketball team has twice played in Torfnes, on 12 May 1995 in a 53–81 loss against Denmark and on 10 May 1998 in a 65–55 victory against Norway.
