= Kiana Johnson =

American basketball player

No. 3 – BC Minsk
- Position: Point guard
- League: Úrvalsdeild kvenna

Personal information
- Born: August 23, 1993 (age 33) Chicago, Illinois
- Listed height: 173 cm (5 ft 8 in)
- Listed weight: 63 kg (139 lb)

Career information
- High school: Whitney Young (Chicago, Illinois)
- College: Michigan State (2011–2014); Virginia Union (2015–2016)
- Playing career: 2016–present
- Number: 3
- Coaching career: 2022–present

Career history

Playing
- 2016–2017: Forssan Alku
- 2017–2018: Tapiolan Honka
- 2018–2019: KR
- 2019–2021: Valur
- 2022: Societa Sportiva Bocca
- 2022–2023: Valur
- 2023–present: BC Minsk

Coaching
- 2022–2023: Valur (assistant)

Career highlights
- As player: 2×Icelandic champion (2021, 2023); Icelandic Super Cup (2019); NCAA DII Player of the Year (2016); Big Ten All-Freshman Team (2012); Úrvalsdeild Playoffs MVP (2023); 2× Úrvalsdeild kvenna assist leader (2020, 2023); As assistant coach: Icelandic champion (2023)

Kiana Johnson (born August 23, 1993) is an American professional basketball player for Belarusian club BC Minsk. She played college basketball for Michigan State and Virginia Union, where she was named the NCAA DII Player of the Year in 2016. In 2021 and 2023, she won the Icelandic championship as a member of Valur.

== College career ==
Johnson started her college career with Michigan State in 2011. She transferred to Virginia Union in 2014 and sat out the 2014–2015 season due to NCAA Transfer Rules. During the 2015–2016 season, Johnson averaged 29.3 points and 8.7 assists, and was named the NCAA Division II women's basketball tournament Player of the Year.

== Playing career ==
In 2016, Johnson signed with Forssan Alku of the Finnish Naisten Korisliiga. For the season she averaged 18.9 points and 5.8 assists per game.

She remained in Finland the following season, signing with Tapiolan Honka. In 33 games, Johnson averaged 17.1 points and 5.5 assists per game.

In 2018, Johnson signed with KR of the Icelandic Úrvalsdeild kvenna. On February 6, 2019, Kiana scored 50 points in a 102–81 victory against Breiðablik along with 16 rebounds and 10 assists. For the season, she averaged 23.2 points, 10.4 rebounds, 7.3 assists and 3.4 steals.

In July 2019, Johnson signed with reigning Úrvalsdeild champions Valur. Valur opened the 2019–20 season by defeating Keflavík, 105–81, in the annual Icelandic Super Cup where Johnson posted 14 points, 6 rebounds, 5 assists and game-high 6 steals. In the Úrvalsdeild, she averaged 22.8 points, 8.0 rebounds and a league leading 8.2 assists per game. However, the last three games of the season and the whole playoffs were canceled due to the coronavirus pandemic in Iceland with Valur being named Divisional champions (Icelandic: Deildarmeistarar) for having the best record at the time but no national champions were crowned.

On 2 June 2021, she won the national championship after Valur beat Haukar 3–0 in the Úrvalsdeild finals.

After playing for Societa Sportiva Bocca in Venezuela, Johnson returned to Iceland and signed again with Valur in June 2022. During the regular season, she averaged 19.9 points, 7.3 rebounds and league leading 7.9 assists per game. On 26 October 2022, she scored a season high 30 points. On 28 April 2023, she won her second Icelandic championship after Valur defeated top-seeded Keflavík in the Úrvalsdeild finals, 3–1, with Johnson being named the Playoffs MVP.

In September 2023, Johnson signed with BC Minsk of the Belarusian Premier League.

== Statistics ==
=== College statistics ===
Legend
| GP | Games played | GS | Games started | MPG | Minutes per game |
| FG% | Field goal percentage | 3P% | 3-point field goal percentage | FT% | Free throw percentage |
| RPG | Rebounds per game | APG | Assists per game | SPG | Steals per game |
| BPG | Blocks per game | PPG | Points per game | **Bold** | Career high |

| Year | Team | GP | Points | FG% | 3P% | FT% | RPG | APG | SPG | BPG | PPG |
| 2011–12 | Michigan State | **32** | 228 | 38.3% | 33.3% | 70.5% | 2.8 | 4.0 | 1.7 | 0.1 | 7.1 |
| 2012–13 | Michigan State | 25 | 233 | 36.3% | 33.0% | 81.6% | 3.4 | 4.2 | 1.9 | 0.1 | 9.3 |
| 2013–14 | Michigan State | 19 | 160 | 38.2% | 32.7% | 65.4% | 2.5 | 6.0 | 1.2 | **0.5** | 8.4 |
| 2014–15 | Did not play – NCAA transfer rules | | | | | | | | | | |
| 2015–16 | Virginia Union | 31 | **905** | **45.6%** | **40.7%** | **82.4%** | **4.7** | **8.7** | **4.1** | 0.2 | **29.2** |
| Career | | 107 | 1526 | 41.8% | 11.1% | 78.6% | 21.2 | 5.8 | 2.3 | 0.2 | 14.3 |
