= Ármann (women's basketball) =

- Founded: 1953
- History: Ármann (1952–2000) Ármann/Þróttur (2000–2008) Ármann (2008–present)
- Arena: Kennaraháskólinn
- Location: Reykjavík, Iceland
- Team colors: Blue, red, white
- Championships: 3 Icelandic champions (1953, 1959, 1960)
- Website: Armenningar.is
Home	Away

The Ármann women's basketball team, commonly known as Ármann, is the women's basketball team of Glímufélagið Ármann multi-sport club, based in Reykjavík, Iceland. It has won the national championship three times, in 1953, 1959 and 1960.

== History ==
Ármann won the ignaural national championship in 1953 and added two more in 1959 and 1960. In 2009, the players, unhappy with poor training facilities and lack of practice time from the club, contacted Ungmennafélagið Stjarnan and inquired if the board would be interested in starting a women's team. The Stjarnan board responded positively, as they had been unsuccessfully trying to start a women's team for a few years, and in the end all 14 Ármann players transferred over to form the first Stjarnan women's team. Ármann did not field a team again until the 2017–2018 season when it failed to register a win in 24 games in the 1. deild kvenna. In May 2020, the team returned to the 1. deild kvenna for the first time since 2018. On 15 March 2022, the team won the 1. deild kvenna championship, its first title in 62 years, after winning 18 of 20 games, including 15 in a row to finish the season.

In March 2025, Ármann gained promotion to the Úrvalsdeild kvenna for the first time in 65 years.

== Trophies and achievements ==
=== Titles ===
- Úrvalsdeild kvenna:
  Winners (3): 1953, 1959, 1960
- 1. deild kvenna:
  Winners (1): 2022, 2025

=== Awards ===
- 1. deild kvenna Domestic Player of the Year
  Jónína Þórdís Karlsdóttir – 2021, 2022, 2025
- 1. deild kvenna Domestic All-First team
  Birgit Ósk Snorradóttir - 2025
  Jónína Þórdís Karlsdóttir – 2021, 2022, 2024, 2025
- 1. deild kvenna Coach of the Year
  Karl Guðlaugsson – 2022, 2025

== Notable players ==
Criteria

To appear in this section a player must have either:

- Played at least three seasons for the club.
- Set a club record or won an individual award while at the club.
- Played at least one official international match for their national team at any time.

- (Iceland) Birgit Ósk Snorradóttir
- (Iceland) Jónína Þórdís Karlsdóttir
- (Iceland) Sylvía Rún Hálfdánardóttir

== Head coaches ==
- (Iceland) Karl Guðlaugsson 2020–2026
- (Iceland) Friðrik Hrafn Jóhannsson 2026–present
