= Fjölnir (women's basketball) =

Ungmennafélagið Fjölnir
- Leagues: Úrvalsdeild kvenna
- Founded: 2005
- History: Fjölnir (2005–present)
- Arena: Dalhús
- Location: Grafarvogur, Iceland
- Team colors: Blue, yellow
- Website: fjolnir.is

The Fjölnir women's basketball team, commonly known as Fjölnir, represents Ungmennafélagið Fjölnir multi-sport club and is based in Grafarvogur, Reykjavík. As of the 2018–2019 season it plays in the Icelandic 1. deild kvenna.

== History ==
Fjölnir played in the top-tier Úrvalsdeild kvenna from 2007 to 2009 and 2010 to 2013. It won its first Úrvalsdeild victory on 3 November 2007. On 2 March 2019, the team won the 1. deild kvenna for the third time in its history. It face Grindavík in the promotion playoffs for a seat in the Úrvalsdeild where it lost 0-3. After the 2019-2020 season was discontinued due to the COVID-19 pandemic in Iceland, Fjölnir was appointed the winner of 1. deild kvenna, due to being in top place at the time, and promoted to the Úrvalsdeild kvenna. Fjölnir finished the 2020–21 season with a 14-7 record and secured a spot in the Úrvalsdeild playoffs for the first time in its history.

== Titles and awards ==
=== Titles ===
1. deild kvenna

- Winners (2): 2007, 2010, 2019, 2020

=== Individual awards ===
- Úrvalsdeild Domestic Player of the Year
  - Dagný Lísa Davíðsdóttir - 2022
- Úrvalsdeild Foreign Player of the Year
  - Aliyah Mazyck - 2022
- Úrvalsdeild Domestic All-First Team
  - Dagný Lísa Davíðsdóttir - 2022
- Úrvalsdeild Women's Young Player of the Year
  - Bergþóra Tómasdóttir - 2011
- 1. deild Domestic MVP
  - Gréta María Grétarsdóttir - 2010
- 1. deild kvenna Domestic All-First team
  - Berglind Karen Ingvarsdóttir - 2018
  - Eva María Emilsdóttir - 2010
  - Gréta María Grétarsdóttir - 2010
  - Hulda Ósk Bergsteinsdóttir - 2019
- 1. deild kvenna Coach of the Year
  - Eggert Maríuson - 2010

== Notable players ==
Criteria

To appear in this section a player must have either:

- Played at least three seasons for the club.
- Set a club record or won an individual award while at the club.
- Played at least one official international match for their national team at any time.
- Played at least one official WNBA match at any time.

- (Iceland) Bergþóra Tómasdóttir
- (Iceland) Birna Eiríksdóttir
- (United States) Britney Jones
- (Iceland) Dagný Lísa Davíðsdóttir
- (Iceland) Diljá Ögn Lárusdóttir
- (Iceland) Gréta María Grétarsdóttir
- (Iceland) Embla Kristínardóttir
- (Lithuania) Lina Pikčiūtė
- (Portugal) Sara Djassi
- (Iceland) Sigrún Björg Ólafsdóttir
- (Iceland) Sigrún Sjöfn Ámundadóttir
- (North Macedonia) Slavica Dimovska

== Coaches ==
- 2007 Nemanja Sovic
- 2007–2008 Gréta María Grétarsdóttir
- 2008–2009 Patrick Oliver
- 2009–2010 Eggert Maríuson
- 2010 Bjarni Magnússon and Örvar Þór Kristjánsson
- 2011–2012 Bragi Magnússon
- 2012–2013 Ágúst Jensson
- 2013–2015 Pétur Már Sigurðsson
- 2015–2018 Sævaldur Bjarnason
- 2018–2022 Halldór Karl Þórisson
- 2022–2023 Kristjana Eir Jónsdóttir

Source 1 Source 2
