= 2018–19 Úrvalsdeild kvenna (basketball) =

Domino's deild kvenna^{1}
- Duration: 3 October 2018 – 27 April 2019
- Games played: 60
- Teams: 8
- TV partner: Stöð 2 Sport

Regular season
- Relegated: Breiðablik

Finals
- Champions: Valur
- Runners-up: Keflavík
- Semi-finalists: Stjarnan, KR
- Finals MVP: (Iceland) Helena Sverrisdóttir

Awards
- Domestic MVP: (Iceland) Helena Sverrisdóttir
- Foreign MVP: (United States) Brittanny Dinkins

Statistical leaders
Points	(United States) Brittanny Dinkins	29.8
Rebounds	(United States) Shequila Joseph	14.5
Assists	(United States) Dani Rodriguez	8.6

Records
- Biggest home win: Valur 111–64 Breiðablik (30 January 2019)
- Biggest away win: Valur 98–67 KR (9 March 2019)
- Highest scoring: Valur 101–94 Keflavík (14 December 2018)
- Winning streak: 18 games Valur
- Losing streak: 13 games Breiðablik
- All statistics correct as of 27 April 2019.^{1} Sponsored league name, referring to Úrvalsdeild kvenna.

The 2018–19 Úrvalsdeild kvenna was the 62nd season of the Úrvalsdeild kvenna, the top tier women's basketball league on Iceland. The season started on 3 October 2018 and concluded on 27 April 2019 with Valur winning their first title after beating Keflavík 3–0 in the Úrvalsdeild finals.

== Competition format ==
The participating teams first play a conventional round-robin schedule with every team playing each opponent twice "home" and twice "away" for a total of 28 games. The top four teams qualify for the championship playoffs whilst the bottom team will be relegated to 1. deild kvenna.

== Teams ==
Team	City, Region	Arena	Head coach
Breiðablik	Kópavogur	Smárinn	(Italy) Antonio D’Albero
Haukar	Hafnarfjörður	Schenkerhöllin	(Iceland) Ólöf Helga Pálsdóttir
Keflavík	Keflavík	TM Höllin	(Iceland) Jón Guðmundsson
KR	Reykjavík	DHL-Höllin	(Iceland) Benedikt Guðmundsson
Skallagrímur	Borgarnes	Fjósið	(Serbia) Biljana Stanković
Snæfell	Stykkishólmur	Fjárhúsið	(Iceland) Baldur Þorleifsson
Stjarnan	Garðabær	Ásgarður	(Iceland) Pétur Már Sigurðsson
Valur	Reykjavík	Origo-völlurinn	(Iceland) Darri Freyr Atlason

=== Managerial changes ===
Team	Outgoing manager	Manner of departure	Date of vacancy	Position in table	Replaced with	Date of appointment
Keflavík	(Iceland) Sverrir Þór Sverrisson	End of contract	5 April 2018	Off-season	(Iceland) Jón Guðmundsson	18 April 2018
Breiðablik	(Iceland) Hildur Sigurðardóttir	Resigned	4 April 2018	Off-season	(Iceland) Margrét Sturlaugsdóttir	18 April 2018
Haukar	(Iceland) Ingvar Þór Guðjónsson	Resigned	26 May 2018	Off-season	(Iceland) Ólöf Helga Pálsdóttir	28 May 2018
Snæfell	(Iceland) Ingi Þór Steinþórsson	End of contract	12 June 2018	Off-season	(Iceland) Baldur Þorleifsson	27 June 2018
Breiðablik	(Iceland) Margrét Sturlaugsdóttir	Health reasons	14 November 2018	8th	(Italy) Antonio D’Albero	15 November 2018
Skallagrímur	(Iceland) Ari Gunnarsson	Fired	26 November 2018	6th	(Serbia) Biljana Stanković	4 December 2018

== Regular season ==
Pos	Team	Pld	W	L	PF	PA	PD	Pts	Qualification or relegation
1	Valur	28	22	6	2330	1910	+420	44	Qualification to playoffs
2	Keflavík	28	21	7	2234	2124	+110	42	Qualification to playoffs
3	Stjarnan	28	18	10	2065	2010	+55	36	Qualification to playoffs, asked for relegation after the season
4	KR	28	16	12	2125	2080	+45	32	Qualification to playoffs
5	Snæfell	28	16	12	2124	2033	+91	32	
6	Haukar	28	9	19	1980	2077	−97	18	
7	Skallagrímur	28	6	22	1879	2180	−301	12	
8	Breiðablik	28	4	24	2043	2366	−323	8	Spared from relegation due to vacance berths

Updated to match(es) played on 27 March 2019. Source: kki.is

== Playoffs ==
The playoffs are played between the four first qualified teams with a 1-1-1-1-1 format, playing seeded teams games 1, 3 and 5 at home.

=== Bracket ===
Semifinals
1	Valur	3
4	Skallagrímur	1
2	Keflavík	3
3	Stjarnan	2

Finals
1	Valur	3
2	Keflavík	0

Updated to match(es) played on 27 April 2019. Source: KKÍ

=== Semifinals ===
Team 1	Series	Team 2	Game 1	Game 2	Game 3	Game 4	Game 5
Valur	3–1	KR	70–61	84–77	85–87	84–81	
Keflavík	3–2	Stjarnan	70–78	62–64	91–67	83–73	85–69

=== Final ===
Team 1	Series	Team 2	Game 1	Game 2	Game 3	Game 4	Game 5
Valur	3–0	Keflavík	75–63	100–96	87–64		

== Notable occurrences ==
- On June 16, reigning Úrvalsdeild Domestic Player of the Year Helena Sverrisdóttir left Haukar and signed with Ceglédi EKK of the Hungarian Nemzeti Bajnokság I/A.
- On June 25, reigning Úrvalsdeild Foreign Player of the Year Danielle Rodriguez resigned with Stjarnan.
- On June 30, Haukar signed former Úrvalsdeild Foreign Player of the Year Lele Hardy.
- On August 14, Breiðablik signed former WNBA player Kelly Faris.
- On September 5, Stjarnan signed Argentinian national team player Florencia Palacios who spent the previous season in the Swedish Basketligan dam.
- On September 14, it was reported that KR had signed former Torpan Pojat player Kiana Johnson.
- On October 31, Brittanny Dinkins scored a career-high 51 points for Keflavík against Breiðablik, including Keflavík's last 14 points in the 85–78 victory.
- On October 31, Danielle Rodriguez was one steal away from a quadruple-double in a victory against Valur. She finished the game with 23 points, 12 rebounds, 13 assists and 9 steals.
- On November 1, it was reported that Valur had released American Brooke Johnson who had averaged 16.5 points, 9.4 rebounds and 3.2 assists per game. In her place, the club signed Heather Butler who last played for Uppsala Basket in the Basketligan dam.
- On November 2, Breiðablik announced that star center Isabella Ósk Sigurðardóttir would miss the rest of the season after tearing her Anterior cruciate ligament on practice. She had been averaging 9.6 points, 10.8 rebounds and league leading 2.2 blocks for the season. In her place, Breiðablik signed Sanja Orozović.
- On November 14, Margrét Sturlaugsdóttir resigned from her post as head coach of Breiðablik for health reasons.
- On November 15, 2018, reigning Úrvalsdeild Domestic Player of the Year, Helena Sverrisdóttir, signed with Valur.
- On November 24, Breiðablik defeated Haukar for its first win of the season, breaking its 8-game losing streak.
- On December 20, it was reported that Stjarnan had released Florencia Palacios who had averaged 11.8 points and 4.0 rebounds while shooting 34.8% from the three-point range in 12 games for the club.
- On December 21, Haukar signed Dutch national team player Janine Guijt for the rest of the season.
- On January 3, Breiðablik announced that it had signed Florencia Palacios who had been released by Stjarnan in December.
- On January 9, Stjarnan and Icelandic national team player Ragna Margrét Brynjarsdóttir played her first game since suffering a concussion during a game on 3 February 2018, scoring 7 points in 12 minutes in a loss against Keflavík.
- On February 6, Kiana Johnson scored 50 points for KR in a 102–81 victory against Breiðablik. She also had 16 rebounds and 10 assists.
- On February 6, Unnur Tara Jónsdóttir of KR and the Icelandic national team suffered a knee injury in a victory against Breiðablik and was initially ruled out for the rest of the season.
- On 11 April, KR's Ástrós Lena Ægisdóttir tied the Úrvalsdeild playoffs record for most three pointers in a game when she made 7 three point shots in a victory against Valur.
