= Skallagrímur (women's basketball) =

Ungmennafélagið Skallagrímur
- History: Skallagrímur (1958–present)
- Arena: Fjósið
- Location: Borgarnes, Iceland
- Team colors: Green, yellow
- Championships: 1 Icelandic Championship
- Website: Skallagrimur.is

The Skallagrímur women's basketball team, commonly known as Skallagrímur, is the women's basketball department of Ungmennafélagið Skallagrímur, based in Borgarnes, Iceland. It currently plays in Úrvalsdeild kvenna.

== History ==
Skallagrímur started its women's program in 1958. In 1963, it participated in the national tournament and finished as the runner-up to ÍR. In 1964 it won its first national championship after finishing first in the national tournament. In the championship clinching game, Skallagrímur defeating ÍR 23-22 behind Sigrún Kristjánsdóttir 17 points.

In 2016-2017 it finished with the third best record in league, while also making it to the Icelandic Basketball Cup finals where it lost to Keflavík, 65-62.

On 15 February 2020, it won the Icelandic Basketball Cup for the first time, defeating KR in the cup finals with Keira Robinson being named the Cup Finals MVP.

On 20 September 2020, Skallagrímur won the Icelandic Super Cup for the first time after defeating Valur 74-68.

On 9 December 2021, the board of Skallagrímur announced that they were withdrawing the team from the Úrvalsdeild. At the time, the team was in last place in the Úrvalsdeild, having lost all 11 games.

== Honours ==
Úrvalsdeild kvenna

- Winners (1): 1964

Icelandic Cup

- Winners (1): 2020
- Runner-up (1): 2017

Icelandic Super Cup

- Winners (1): 2020
- Runner-up (1): 2017

Division I

- Winners (3): 1996, 1997, 2016

== Individual awards ==
- Úrvalsdeild Women's Domestic All-First Team
  - Sigrún Sjöfn Ámundadóttir - 2017
- Icelandic Cup Finals MVP
  - Keira Robinson - 2020

== Notable players ==
Criteria

To appear in this section a player must have either:

- Played at least three seasons for the club.
- Set a club record or won an individual award while at the club.
- Played at least one official international match for their national team at any time.
- Played at least one official WNBA match at any time.

- (Iceland) Auður Íris Ólafsdóttir
- (United States) Carmen Tyson-Thomas
- (Iceland) Embla Kristínardóttir
- (Denmark) Emilie Hesseldal
- (Iceland) Fanney Lind Thomas
- (Iceland) Guðrún Ósk Ámundadóttir
- (Iceland) Hulda K. Harðardóttir
- (Iceland) Ingibjörg Hargrave
- (Iceland) Jóhanna Björk Sveinsdóttir
- (Spain) Lidia Mirchandani
- (United States) Keira Robinson
- (Iceland) Kristrún Sigurjónsdóttir
- (Iceland) María Erla Geirsdóttir
- (Iceland) Ragnheiður Benónísdóttir
- (Serbia) Sanja Orozović
- (Iceland) Sigrún Sjöfn Ámundadóttir
- (United States) Tavelyn Brittany James (Tillman)
- (Iceland) Þóra Kristín Jónsdóttir
- (Chile) Ziomara Morrison

== Coaches ==
- (Iceland) Guðmundur Sigurðsson 1958–19??
- (Iceland) Anna Björk Bjarnadóttir 1995–1997
- (Spain) Manuel Angel Rodriguez Escudero 2015–2017
- (Spain) Ricardo González Dávila 2017–2018
- (Iceland) Ari Gunnarsson 2018
- (Iceland) Guðrún Ósk Ámundadóttir 2018
- (Serbia) Biljana Stanković 2018–2019
- (Iceland) Guðrún Ósk Ámundadóttir 2019–2021
- (Serbia) Goran Miljevic 2021
- (Serbia) Nebojsa Knezevic 2021
