= Valur (women's basketball) =

- Leagues: Úrvalsdeild kvenna
- Arena: Hlíðarendi
- Location: Reykjavík, Iceland
- Team colors: red, white, blue
- President: Svali Björgvinsson
- Head coach: Jamil Abiad
- Assistant(s): Margrét Ósk Einarsdóttir
- Championships: 3 Úrvalsdeild kvenna
- Website: Valur.is
Home	Away

The Valur women's basketball team, commonly known as Valur, is a basketball team based in Reykjavík, Iceland. It is part of the Valur multi-sport club. In 2019, it won its first national championship.

== Recent history ==
Valur played in the 2018 Úrvalsdeild finals, losing to Haukar 2–3. In April 2019, Valur won its first ever national championship when it beat Keflavík in the Úrvalsdeild finals 3–0.

The team opened the 2019–20 season by defeating Keflavík, 105–81, in the annual Icelandic Super Cup. It was Valur's first Super Cup win and the victory made them the holders of all four major national crowns, the others being the national championship, the national cup and the league championship which is awarded for the best regular season record in the Úrvalsdeild. On 28 December 2019, the team was selected as the Icelandic Sports Team of the Year by the Icelandic Association of Sports Journalists in an annual ceremony held by the National Olympic and Sports Association of Iceland. On 2 June 2021, Valur won its second championship after beating Haukar 3–0 in the Úrvalsdeild finals.

On 28 April 2023, Valur won its third national championship after beating Keflavík 3–1 in the Úrvalsdeild finals with Kiana Johnson being named the Playoffs MVP.

== Season by season ==
Season	Tier	League	Pos.	W–L	Playoffs	Icelandic Cup
1993–94	1	Úrvalsdeild kvenna	5th	7–11	DNQ	Semi-finals
1994–95	1	Úrvalsdeild kvenna	5th	12–12	DNQ	Semi-finals
1995–96	1	Úrvalsdeild kvenna	8th	5–13	DNQ	Final 8
Inactive
2007–08	1	Úrvalsdeild kvenna	5th	11–13	DNQ	Final 8
2008–09	1	Úrvalsdeild kvenna	5th	12–7	1st Round	Final 8
2009–10	1	Úrvalsdeild kvenna	8th	3–17	DNQ	1st Round
2010–11	2	1. deild kvenna	2nd	11–3	Promotion	1st Round
2011–12	1	Úrvalsdeild kvenna	6th	12–16	DNQ	1st Round
2012–13	1	Úrvalsdeild kvenna	4th	16–12	Semi-finals	Runner-up
2013–14	1	Úrvalsdeild kvenna	4th	14–14	Semi-finals	2nd Round
2014–15	1	Úrvalsdeild kvenna	5th	15–13	DNQ	2nd Round
2015–16	1	Úrvalsdeild kvenna	3rd	13–11	Semi-finals	1st Round
2016–17	1	Úrvalsdeild kvenna	5th	12–16	DNQ	1st Round
2017–18	1	Úrvalsdeild kvenna	3rd	19–9	Runner-up	1st Round
2018–19	1	Úrvalsdeild kvenna	1st	22–6	Champions	Winner
2019–20	1	Úrvalsdeild kvenna	1st	22–3	Canceled^{1}	Semi-finals
2020–21	1	Úrvalsdeild kvenna	1st	18–3	Champions	Semi-finals
2021–22	1	Úrvalsdeild kvenna	2nd	16–8	Semi-finals	1st Round
2022–23	1	Úrvalsdeild kvenna	3rd	22–6	Champions	1st Round

Notes
^{1} 2020 playoffs canceled due to the Coronavirus pandemic in Iceland.

== Honours ==
=== Titles ===
Úrvalsdeild kvenna:

- Winners (3): 2019, 2021, 2023

Icelandic Cup

- Winners (1): 2019

Icelandic Super Cup

- Winners (1): 2019

Icelandic Company Cup

- Winners (1): 2013

Icelandic Sports Team of the Year

- 2019

=== Individual awards ===
- Úrvalsdeild Women's Domestic All-First Team
  - Dagbjört Dögg Karlsdóttir - 2022
  - Elín Sóley Hrafnkelsdóttir – 2018
  - Guðbjörg Sverrisdóttir – 2016, 2018
  - Helena Sverrisdóttir – 2019, 2021
  - Hildur Björg Kjartansdóttir – 2021, 2023
  - Kristrún Sigurjónsdóttir – 2013
  - Linda Stefánsdóttir – 1994, 1995
  - Signý Hermannsdóttir – 2008, 2009
- Úrvalsdeild Women's Domestic Player of the Year
  - Helena Sverrisdóttir – 2019
- Úrvalsdeild Women's Defensive Player of the Year
  - Dagbjört Dögg Karlsdóttir – 2021
- Úrvalsdeild Women's Young Player of the Year
  - Dagbjört Dögg Karlsdóttir – 2018
- Úrvalsdeild Women's Playoffs MVP
  - Helena Sverrisdóttir – 2019, 2021
  - Kiana Johnson – 2023
- Icelandic Cup Finals MVP
  - Helena Sverrisdóttir – 2019
- Úrvalsdeild Kvenna Coach of the Year
  - Ólafur Jónas Sigurðsson – 2021, 2023

== Notable players ==
Criteria

To appear in this section a player must have either:

- Set a club record or won an individual award while at the club.
- Played at least one official international match for their national team at any time.
- Played at least one official WNBA match at any time.

- (Iceland) Alda Leif Jónsdóttir
- (United States) Ameryst Alston
- (Iceland) Ásta Júlía Grímsdóttir
- (Iceland) Bergþóra Tómasdóttir
- (Iceland) Dagbjört Dögg Karlsdóttir
- (Iceland) Elín Sóley Hrafnkelsdóttir
- (Iceland) Embla Kristínardóttir
- (Iceland) Guðbjörg Sverrisdóttir
- (Iceland) Hafdís Helgadóttir
- (Iceland) Hallveig Jónsdóttir
- (United States) Heather Butler
- (Iceland) Helena Sverrisdóttir
- (Iceland) Hildur Björg Kjartansdóttir
- (United States) Kiana Johnson
- (Iceland) Kristjana Magnúsdóttir
- (Iceland) Kristrún Sigurjónsdóttir
- (Iceland) Linda Stefánsdóttir
- (Iceland) María Ben Erlingsdóttir
- (Iceland) Ragna Margrét Brynjarsdóttir
- (Iceland) Signý Hermannsdóttir
- (Slovakia) Simona Podesvová
- (Iceland) Sóllilja Bjarnadóttir
- (Iceland) Sylvía Rún Hálfdánardóttir
