= 1. deild kvenna (basketball) =

- Founded: 1984; 42 years ago
- First season: 1984–1985
- Country: Iceland
- Confederation: FIBA Europe
- Number of teams: 9
- Level on pyramid: 2
- Promotion to: Úrvalsdeild kvenna
- Domestic cup: Bikarkeppni KKÍ
- Supercup: Meistarakeppni kvenna
- Most championships: Njarðvík (5 titles)
- CEO: Hannes S. Jónsson
- Website: KKÍ.is

1. deild kvenna (English: Women's first division) is the second-tier basketball competition among clubs in Iceland.

== History ==
The league was founded 1984 and until 2005 it was known as 2. deild kvenna (English: Women's second division).

On 13 March 2020, the rest of the 2019–20 season was postponed due to the coronavirus outbreak in Iceland.

== Format ==
The team with the best record is crowned first division champion. The top two teams then play a best–of–three playoff for a promotion to the Úrvalsdeild.

== Past winners ==
- 1984–1985: Keflavík
- 1993–1994: Breiðablik
- 1994–1995: Víðir
- 1995–1996: Skallagrímur
- 1996–1997: Skallagrímur
- 1997–1998: Tindastóll
- 1998–1999: Tindastóll
- 1999–2000: Njarðvík
- 2000–2001: Njarðvík
- 2001–2002: Haukar
- 2002–2003: ÍR
- 2003–2004: Haukar
- 2004–2005: Breiðablik
- 2005–2006: Hamar/Selfoss*
- 2006–2007: Fjölnir
- 2007–2008: Snæfell
- 2008–2009: Njarðvík
- 2009–2010: Fjölnir
- 2010–2011: Stjarnan
- 2011–2012: Grindavík
- 2012–2013: Hamar
- 2013–2014: Breiðablik
- 2014–2015: Njarðvík
- 2015–2016: Skallagrímur
- 2016–2017: Þór Akureyri
- 2017–2018: KR
- 2018–2019: Fjölnir
- 2019–2020: Fjölnir
- 2020–2021: Njarðvík
- 2021–2022: Ármann
- 2022–2023: Stjarnan
- 2023–2024: Hamar/Þór Þorlákshöfn*
- 2024–2025: Ármann
- 2025–2026: Aþena

*Joint team.

== Awards and honors ==
=== Individual awards ===
Season	Domestic MVP		Foreign MVP		Defense Player of The Year		Young Player of The Year		Coach of The Year	
2024–25	(Iceland) Jónína Þórdís Karlsdóttir	Ármann	(United States) Brazil Harvey-Carr	Fjölnir	(Iceland) Rebekka Rut Steingrímsdóttir	Njarðvík	(Iceland) Elísabet Ólafsdóttir,	Stjarnan U	(Iceland) Karl Guðlaugsson	Ármann
2022–23	(Iceland) Diljá Ögn Lárusdóttir	Stjarnan	(United States) Chea Rael Whitsitt	Snæfell	(Iceland) Ísold Sævarsdóttir	Stjarnan	(Iceland) Kolbrún María Ármannsdóttir	Stjarnan	(Iceland) Auður Íris Ólafsdóttir	Stjarnan
2021–22	(Iceland) Jónína Þórdís Karlsdóttir	Ármann	(United States) Astaja Tyghter	Hamar/Þór			(Iceland) Diljá Ögn Lárusdóttir	Stjarnan	(Iceland) Karl Guðlaugsson	Ármann
2020–21	(Iceland) Jónína Þórdís Karlsdóttir	Ármann	(United States) Chelsea Nacole Jennings	Njarðvík			(Iceland) Hekla Eik Nökkvadóttir	Grindavík	(Iceland) Rúnar Ingi Erlingsson	Njarðvík
2019–20	None selected after season was canceled due to the coronavirus pandemic in Iceland									
2018–19	(Iceland) Hrund Skúladóttir	Grindavík	(United States) Tessondra Williams	Tindastóll			(Iceland) Vilborg Jónsdóttir	Njarðvík	(Iceland) Jóhann Árni Ólafsson	Grindavík
2017–18	(Iceland) Perla Jóhannsdóttir	KR					(Iceland) Eygló Kristín Óskarsdóttir	KR	(Iceland) Benedikt Guðmundsson	KR
2016–17	(Iceland) Sóllilja Bjarnadóttir	Breiðablik					(Iceland) Ásta Júlía Grímsdóttir	KR	(Iceland) Hildur Sigurðardóttir	Breiðablik
2015–16	(Iceland) Guðrún Gróa Þorsteinsdóttir	KR					(Iceland) Isabella Ósk Sigurðardóttir	Breiðablik	(Iceland) Darri Freyr Atlason	KR
2014–15	(Iceland) Bryndís Hanna Hreinsdóttir	Stjarnan					(Iceland) Eva Margrét Kristjánsdóttir	KFÍ	(Iceland) Sævaldur Bjarnason	Stjarnan
...
2009–10	(Iceland) Gréta María Grétarsdóttir	Fjölnir							(Iceland) Eggert Maríuson	Fjölnir

=== Domestic All-First team ===
Season	Domestic First team	
Season	Players	Teams
2024–25	Jónína Þórdís Karlsdóttir	Ármann
2024–25	Rebekka Rut Steingrímsdóttir	KR
2024–25	Birgit Ósk Snorradóttir	Ármann
2024–25	Anna María Magnúsdóttir	KR
2024–25	Aðalheiður María Davíðsdóttir	Fjölnir
2022–23	Diljá Ögn Lárusdóttir	Stjarnan
2022–23	Rebekka Rán Karlsdóttir	Snæfell
2022–23	Emma Hrönn Hákonardóttir	Hamar/Þór
2022–23	Hulda Ósk Bergsteinsdóttir	KR
2022–23	Ása Lind Wolfram	Aþena
2021–22	Írena Sól Jónsdóttir	ÍR
2021–22	Diljá Ögn Lárusdóttir	Stjarnan
2021–22	Jónína Þórdís Karlsdóttir	Ármann
2021–22	Hulda Ósk Bergsteinsdóttir	KR
2021–22	Aníka Linda Hjálmarsdóttir	ÍR
2020–21	Vilborg Jónsdóttir	Njarðvík
2020–21	Jónína Þórdís Karlsdóttir	Ármann
2020–21	Hekla Eik Nökkvadóttir	Grindavík
2020–21	Aníka Linda Hjálmarsdóttir	ÍR
2020–21	Bergdís Lilja Þorsteinsdóttir	Stjarnan
2019–20	Season canceled in March 2020 due to the coronavirus outbreak in Iceland	
2018–19	Kamilla Sól Viktorsdóttir	Njarðvík
2018–19	Hrund Skúladóttir	Grindavík
2018–19	Sylvía Rún Hálfdánardóttir	Þór Akureyri
2018–19	Rut Herner Konráðsdóttir	Þór Akureyri
2018–19	Hulda Ósk Bergsteinsdóttir	Fjölnir
2017–18	Berglind Karen Ingvarsdóttir	Fjölnir
2017–18	Perla Jóhannsdóttir	KR
2017–18	Hanna Þráinsdóttir	ÍR
2017–18	Heiða Hlín Björnsdóttir	Þór Akureyri
2017–18	Unnur Lára Ásgeirsdóttir	Þór Akureyri
2016–17	Sóllilja Bjarnadóttir	Breiðablik
2016–17	Telma Lind Ásgeirsdóttir	Breiðablik
2016–17	Unnur Lára Ásgeirsdóttir	Þór Akureyri
2016–17	Rut Herner Konráðsdóttir	Þór Akureyri
2016–17	Isabella Ósk Sigurðardóttir	Breiðablik
2015–16	Perla Jóhannsdóttir	KR
2015–16	Kristrún Sigurjónsdóttir	Skallagrímur
2015–16	Sólrún Sæmundsdóttir	Skallagrímur
2015–16	Guðrún Gróa Þorsteinsdóttir	KR
2015–16	Fanney Lind Thomas	Þór Akureyri
2014–15	Bryndís Hanna Hreinsdóttir	Stjarnan
2014–15	Erna Hákonardóttir	Njarðvík
2014–15	Eva Margrét Kristjánsdóttir	KFÍ
2014–15	Bríet Lilja Sigurðardóttir	Tindastóll
2014–15	Eva María Emilsdóttir	Stjarnan
2009–10	Íris Gunnarsdóttir	Skallagrímur
2009–10	Erna Rún Magnúsdóttir	Þór Akureyri
2009–10	Eva María Emilsdóttir	Fjölnir
2009–10	Gréta María Grétarsdóttir	Fjölnir
2009–10	Salbjörg Sævarsdóttir	Laugdælir
