= Úrvalsdeild Women's Domestic All-First Team =

The Women's Domestic All-First Team is an annual Úrvalsdeild honor bestowed on the best players in the league following every season.

== All-time award winners ==
The following is a list of the recent Úrvalsdeild Women's Domestic All-First Teams.

Season	First team	
Season	Players	Teams
1994–95	Anna Dís Sveinbjörnsdóttir	Grindavík
1994–95	Anna María Sveinsdóttir	Keflavík
1994–95	Björg Hafsteinsdóttir	Keflavík
1994–95	Helga Þorvaldsdóttir	KR
1994–95	Linda Stefánsdóttir	Valur
1995–96	Anna Dís Sveinbjörnsdóttir	ÍR
1995–96	Anna María Sveinsdóttir	Keflavík
1995–96	Guðbjörg Norðfjörð	KR
1995–96	Helga Þorvaldsdóttir	KR
1995–96	Linda Stefánsdóttir	ÍR
1996–97	Alda Leif Jónsdóttir	ÍS
1996–97	Anna María Sveinsdóttir	Keflavík
1996–97	Birna Valgarðsdóttir	Keflavík
1996–97	Erla Reynisdóttir	Keflavík
1996–97	Guðbjörg Norðfjörð	KR
1997–98	Alda Leif Jónsdóttir	ÍS
1997–98	Anna María Sveinsdóttir	Keflavík
1997–98	Erla Reynisdóttir	Keflavík
1997–98	Erla Þorsteinsdóttir	Keflavík
1997–98	Guðbjörg Norðfjörð	KR
2012–13	Pálína Gunnlaugsdóttir	Keflavík
2012–13	Kristrún Sigurjónsdóttir	Valur
2012–13	Hildur Sigurðardóttir	Snæfell
2012–13	Hildur Björg Kjartansdóttir	Snæfell
2012–13	Bryndís Guðmundsdóttir	Keflavík
2013–14	Sigrún Sjöfn Ámundadóttir	KR
2013–14	Hildur Sigurðardóttir	Snæfell
2013–14	Hildur Björg Kjartansdóttir	Snæfell
2013–14	Guðrún Gróa Þorsteinsdóttir	Snæfell
2013–14	Bryndís Guðmundsdóttir	Keflavík
2014–15	Sara Rún Hinriksdóttir	Keflavík
2014–15	Petrúnella Skúladóttir	Grindavík
2014–15	Hildur Sigurðardóttir	Snæfell
2014–15	Gunnhildur Gunnarsdóttir	Snæfell
2014–15	Bryndís Guðmundsdóttir	Keflavík
2015–16	Sigrún Sjöfn Ámundadóttir	Grindavík
2015–16	Helena Sverrisdóttir	Haukar
2015–16	Gunnhildur Gunnarsdóttir	Snæfell
2015–16	Guðbjörg Sverrisdóttir	Valur
2015–16	Bryndís Guðmundsdóttir	Snæfell
2016–17	Berglind Gunnarsdóttir	Snæfell
2016–17	Emelía Ósk Gunnarsdóttir	Keflavík
2016–17	Thelma Dís Ágústsdóttir	Keflavík
2016–17	Sigrún Sjöfn Ámundadóttir	Skallagrímur
2016–17	Ragna Margrét Brynjarsdóttir	Stjarnan
2017–18	Þóra Kristín Jónsdóttir	Haukar
2017–18	Guðbjörg Sverrisdóttir	Valur
2017–18	Thelma Dís Ágústsdóttir	Keflavík
2017–18	Helena Sverrisdóttir	Haukar
2017–18	Elín Sóley Hrafnkelsdóttir	Valur
2018–19	Þóra Kristín Jónsdóttir	Haukar
2018–19	Gunnhildur Gunnarsdóttir	Snæfell
2018–19	Helena Sverrisdóttir	Haukar
2018–19	Bríet Sif Hinriksdóttir	Stjarnan
2018–19	Bryndís Guðmundsdóttir	Keflavík
2019–20	None selected after season was canceled due to the coronavirus pandemic in Iceland	
2020–21	Sara Rún Hinriksdóttir	Haukar
2020–21	Þóra Kristín Jónsdóttir	Haukar
2020–21	Helena Sverrisdóttir	Valur
2020–21	Isabella Ósk Sigurðardóttir	Breiðablik
2020–21	Hildur Björg Kjartansdóttir	Valur
2021–22	Dagbjört Dögg Karlsdóttir	Valur
2021–22	Eva Margrét Kristjánsdóttir	Haukar
2021–22	Helena Sverrisdóttir	Haukar
2021–22	Dagný Lísa Davíðsdóttir	Fjölnir
2021–22	Isabella Ósk Sigurðardóttir	Breiðablik
2022–23	Anna Ingunn Svansdóttir	Keflavík
2022–23	Tinna Guðrún Alexandersdóttir	Haukar
2022–23	Eva Margrét Kristjánsdóttir	Haukar
2022–23	Hildur Björg Kjartansdóttir	Valur
2022–23	Birna Valgerður Benónýsdóttir	Keflavík
2023–24
2024–25	Þóra Kristín Jónsdóttir	Haukar
2024–25	Tinna Guðrún Alexandersdóttir	Haukar
2024–25	Thelma Dís Ágústsdóttir	Keflavík
2024–25	Sara Rún Hinriksdóttir	Keflavík
2024–25	Isabella Ósk Sigurðardóttir	Grindavík
