= 2017–18 Úrvalsdeild kvenna (basketball) =

Domino's deild kvenna^{1}
- Duration: October 4, 2017 – April 30, 2018
- Teams: 8
- TV partner: Stöð 2 Sport

Regular season
- Top seed: Haukar
- Relegated: Njarðvík

Finals
- Champions: Haukar
- Runners-up: Valur
- Semi-finalists: Keflavík, Skallagrímur
- Finals MVP: (Iceland) Helena Sverrisdóttir

Awards
- Domestic MVP: (Iceland) Helena Sverrisdóttir
- Foreign MVP: (United States) Danielle Rodriguez

Statistical leaders
Points	(United States) Carmen Tyson-Thomas	34.0
Rebounds	(United States) Shalonda Winton	18.5
Assists	(United States) Brittanny Dinkins	9.2

Records
- Highest scoring: Keflavík 107–92 Skallagrímur (25 October 2017)
- Winning streak: Keflavík, Haukar; 14 games
- Losing streak: Njarðvík; 26 games
- All statistics correct as of 30 April 2018.^{1} Sponsored league name, referring to Úrvalsdeild kvenna.

The 2017–18 Úrvalsdeild kvenna was the 61st season of the Úrvalsdeild kvenna, the top tier women's basketball league on Iceland. The season started on October 4, 2017 and concluded on April 30, 2018, with Haukar winning their fourth title after beating Valur 3–2 in the Úrvalsdeild finals. Helena Sverrisdóttir was named the Playoffs MVP after averaging 20.2 points, 12.2 rebounds and 10.8 assists in the finals series.

== Competition format ==
The participating teams first play a conventional round-robin schedule with every team playing each opponent twice "home" and twice "away" for a total of 28 games. The top four teams qualify for the championship playoffs whilst the bottom team will be relegated to Division 1.

== Teams ==
Team	City, Region	Arena	Head coach
Breiðablik	Kópavogur	Smárinn	(Iceland) Hildur Sigurðardóttir
Haukar	Hafnarfjörður	Schenkerhöllin	(Iceland) Ingvar Þór Guðjónsson
Keflavík	Keflavík	TM Höllin	(Iceland) Sverrir Þór Sverrisson
Njarðvík	Njarðvík	Ljónagryfjan	(Iceland) Ragnar Halldór Ragnarsson
Skallagrímur	Borgarnes	Fjósið	(Iceland) Ari Gunnarsson
Snæfell	Stykkishólmur	Fjárhúsið	(Iceland) Ingi Þór Steinþórsson
Stjarnan	Garðabær	Ásgarður	(Iceland) Pétur Már Sigurðsson
Valur	Reykjavík	Valshöllin	(Iceland) Darri Freyr Atlason

=== Managerial changes ===
Team	Outgoing manager	Manner of departure	Date of vacancy	Position in table	Replaced with	Date of appointment
Njarðvík	(Iceland) Agnar Gunnarsson	End of contract	-	Pre-season	(Iceland) Hallgrímur Brynjólfsson	7 May 2017
Valur	(Iceland) Ari Gunnarsson	End of contract	-	Pre-season	(Iceland) Darri Freyr Atlason	3 April 2017
Skallagrímur	(Spain) Manuel Angel Rodriguez Escudero	Sacked	25 May 2017	Pre-season	(Spain) Ricardo González Dávila	3 June 2017
Skallagrímur	(Spain) Ricardo González Dávila	Sacked	14 January 2018	6th	(Iceland) Ari Gunnarsson	16 January 2018
Njarðvík	(Iceland) Hallgrímur Brynjólfsson	Sacked	19 January 2018	8th	(Iceland) Ragnar Halldór Ragnarsson	19 January 2018

== Regular season ==
Pos	Team	Pld	W	L	PF	PA	PD	Pts	Qualification or relegation
1	Haukar	28	21	7	2236	2006	+230	42	Qualification to playoffs
2	Keflavík	28	20	8	2295	2107	+188	40	Qualification to playoffs
3	Valur	28	19	9	2200	1975	+225	38	Qualification to playoffs
4	Skallagrímur	28	14	14	2150	2135	+15	28	Qualification to playoffs
5	Stjarnan	28	14	14	2040	2008	+32	28	
6	Snæfell	28	12	16	2007	2072	−65	24	
7	Breiðablik	28	11	17	1931	2083	−152	22	
8	Njarðvík	28	1	27	1781	2254	−473	2	Relegated

Updated to match(es) played on 26 March 2018. Source: Úrvalsdeild kvenna 2017-18

== Playoffs ==
The playoffs are played between the four first qualified teams with a 1-1-1-1-1 format, playing seeded teams games 1, 3 and 5 at home.

=== Bracket ===
Semifinals
1	Haukar	3
4	Skallagrímur	0
2	Keflavík	1
3	Valur	3

Finals
1	Haukar	3
3	Valur	2

Updated to match(es) played on 30 April 2018. Source: KKÍ

=== Semifinals ===
Team 1	Series	Team 2	Game 1	Game 2	Game 3	Game 4	Game 5
Haukar	3–0	Skallagrímur	88–74	75–64	77–63		
Keflavík	1–3	Valur	77–88	87–80	95–79	82–99	

=== Final ===
Team 1	Series	Team 2	Game 1	Game 2	Game 3	Game 4	Game 5
Haukar	3–2	Valur	85–68	76–80	96–85	66–68	74–70

== Notable occurrences ==
- On October 8, Kristen McCarthy scored 53 points in a victory against Skallagrímur in the Úrvalsdeild kvenna.
- On October 8, Njarðvík released Erika Williams.
- On October 21, Danielle Victoria Rodriguez notched a triple-double for Stjarnan against Snæfell with 31 points, 14 rebounds and 12 assists.
- On November 12, former Icelandic national team member and Skallagrímur's forward Fanney Lind Thomas announced her retirement from basketball due to head injuries sustained in a game against Valur on October 11.
- On November 22, Kristen McCarthy broke the fifty-point barrier again when she scored 50 points in a losing effort against defending champions Keflavík.
- On November 29, Skallagrímur's forward Sigrún Sjöfn Ámundadóttir dislocated her shoulder in a game against Valur.
- On December 3, Kristen McCarthy had a quadruple-double in a victory against Njarðvík with 31 points, 15 rebounds, 12 steals and 10 assists.
- On December 6, Keflavík's Emelía Ósk Gunnarsdóttir tore a cruciate ligament in her knee in a game against Skallagrímur and was expected to miss the rest of the season. In her place, Keflavík signed national team member Embla Kristínardóttir from Grindavík.
- On December 13, Danielle Victoria Rodriguez notched her second triple-double of the season with 46 points, 11 rebounds and 11 assists against Skallagrímur.
- On December 15, Helena Sverrisdóttir was named the best player of the first half of the season and to the All-First team of team of the first half of the season, along with Hallveig Jónsdóttir, Thelma Dís Ágústsdóttir, Danielle Victoria Rodriguez and Berglind Gunnarsdóttir. Hildur Sigurðardóttir of Breiðablik was named the best coach of the first half of the season while Ragna Margrét Brynjarsdóttir was named the best defender and Ísabella Sigurðardóttir the best young player of the first half.
- On December 16, Helena Sverrisdóttir had a triple-double in a win against Skallagrímur with 23 points, 16 rebounds and 15 assists.
- On December 20, Haukar loaned Helena Sverrisdóttir to Good Angels Kosice until the end of January 2018.
- On December 29, top-placed Valur announced they had released Alexandra Petersen and signed Aaliyah Whiteside in her place. Petersen joined Division I club KR on January 4, 2018.
- On January 4, Skallagrímur signed former WNBA and EuroLeague player Ziomara Morrison to a short-term contract.
- On January 6, former Icelandic Basketball Player of the Year Gunnhildur Gunnarsdóttir returned to the court for Snæfell after missing the first half of the season due to pregnancy.
- On January 6, Keflavík held Snæfell scoreless in the fourth quarter of its 80–53 victory against them.
- On January 8, Haukar released Cherise Daniels and signed former Grindavík player Whitney Frazier.
- On January 13, Keflavík announced that Þóranna Kika Hodge-Carr would miss the rest of the season after tearing a cruciate ligament in her knee. She was the second Keflavík player to go down with a torn cruciate ligament, after Emelía Ósk Gunnarsdóttir who suffered the same injury a month earlier.
- On January 14, Skallagrímur fired Ricardo González Dávila as its head coach. Skallagrímur had lost in the Icelandic Basketball Cup semi-finals two days before and a rift between Dávila and star player Carmen Tyson-Thomas became public after the game.
- On January 16, Skallagrímur hired former Valur head coach, Ari Gunnarsson, as their replacement for Ricardo González Dávila.
- On January 19, Njarðvík replaced Hallgrím Brynjólfsson as head coach with Ragnar Halldór Ragnarsson. Njarðvík had lost all sixteen games in the league but had reached the Icelandic Basketball Cup finals where it lost to Keflavík.
- On January 24, Danielle Victoria Rodriguez notched her third triple-double of the season with 30 points, 19 rebounds and 17 assists.
- On January 27, Breiðablik signed former WNBA player Whitney Knight, replacing Ivory Crawford.
- On March 21, Njarðvík ended its 30-game Úrvalsdeild kvenna losing streak by beating Breiðablik, 77–59. It was Njarðvík's first Úrvalsdeild victory since March 1, 2017. They had lost the last four games of the 2016–17 season and first twenty-six games of the 2017–18 season. Due to a rash of injuries in her Breiðablik squad, former international and head coach of Breiðablik, Hildur Sigurðardóttir, donned a uniform during the game for the first time since the end of the 2014–15 season. In six minutes, she had two points and 4 assists.
