= 2021–22 Úrvalsdeild kvenna (basketball) =

Subway deild kvenna^{1}
- Duration: 6 October 2021 – 1 May 2022
- Teams: 8
- TV partner: Stöð 2 Sport

Regular season
- Top seed: Fjölnir

Finals
- Champions: Njarðvík
- Runners-up: Haukar
- Semi-finalists: Fjölnir, Valur
- Finals MVP: (United States) Aliyah Collier

Awards
- Domestic MVP: (Iceland) Dagný Davíðsdóttir
- Foreign MVP: (United States) Aliyah Mazyck

Statistical leaders
Points	(United States) Aliyah Mazyck	28.5
Rebounds	(United States) Aliyah Collier	15.1
Assists	(United States) Ameryst Alston	6.4
- All statistics correct as of 31 March 2022.^{1} Sponsored league name, referring to Úrvalsdeild kvenna.

The 2021–22 Úrvalsdeild kvenna was the 65th season of the Úrvalsdeild kvenna, the top tier women's basketball league on Iceland. The season started on 6 October 2021 and concluded on 1 May 2022 with Njarðvík after beating Haukar in the Úrvalsdeild finals, 3–2.

== Competition format ==
The participating teams first play a conventional round-robin schedule with every team playing each opponent twice "home" and twice "away" for a total of 28 games. The top four teams qualify for the championship playoffs whilst the bottom team will be relegated to 1. deild kvenna.

== Teams ==
Team	City, region	Arena	Head coach
Breiðablik	Kópavogur	Smárinn	(Iceland) Ívar Ásgrímsson
Grindavík	Grindavík	HS Orku-höllin	(Iceland) Þorleifur Ólafsson
Fjölnir	Grafarvogur	Dalhús	(Iceland) Halldór Karl Þórisson
Haukar	Hafnarfjörður	Schenkerhöllin	(Iceland) Bjarni Magnússon
Keflavík	Keflavík	TM Höllin	(Iceland) Jón Halldór Eðvaldsson
Njarðvík	Njarðvík	Ljónagryfjan	(Iceland) Rúnar Ingi Erlingsson
Skallagrímur	Borgarnes	Fjósið	(Serbia) Nebojsa Knezevic
Valur	Reykjavík	Origo-völlurinn	(Iceland) Ólafur Jónas Sigurðsson

=== Managerial changes ===
Team	Outgoing manager	Manner of departure	Date of vacancy	Position in table	Replaced with	Date of appointment
Grindavík	(Iceland) Ólöf Helga Pálsdóttir	End of contract	23 June 2021	Off-season	(Iceland) Þorleifur Ólafsson	23 June 2021
Skallagrímur	(Iceland) Guðrún Ósk Ámundadóttir	Resigned	1 July 2021	Off-season	(Serbia) Goran Miljevic	26 July 2021
Skallagrímur	(Serbia) Goran Miljevic	Resigned	27 October 2021	8th	(Serbia) Nebojša Knezević	29 October 2021

== Regular season ==
Pos	Team	Pld	W	L	PF	PA	PD	Pts	Qualification or relegation
1	Fjölnir	24	16	8	2012	1891	+121	32	Qualification to playoffs
2	Valur	24	16	8	1834	1710	+124	32	Qualification to playoffs
3	Haukar	24	15	9	1872	1702	+170	30	Qualification to playoffs
4	Njarðvík	24	14	10	1657	1596	+61	28	Qualification to playoffs
5	Keflavík	24	11	13	1841	1808	+33	22	
6	Grindavík	24	6	18	1695	1977	−282	12	
7	Breiðablik	24	6	18	1709	1936	−227	12	
8	Skallagrímur	0	0	0	0	0	0	0	Folded midway through the season.

Updated to match(es) played on 31 March 2022. Source: kki.is

== Clubs in European competitions ==
Team	Competition	Progress
Haukar	EuroCup	Group stage

== Notable occurrences ==
- On 2 June, Snæfell announced that it would withdraw its team from the Úrvalsdeild and register it in the second-tier 1. deild kvenna.
- On 13 June, it was reported that Keflavík's forward Thelma Dís Ágústsdóttir would return to Ball State to finish her master's degree and her remaining college eligibility.
- On 14 June, Fjölnir signed Dagný Lísa Davíðsdóttir who spent the previous season with the University of Wyoming and Hamar/Þór Þórlákshöfn. With Wyoming, Dagný averaged 9.0 stig and 5.4 fráköst and helped the team reach the round of 64 of the 2021 NCAA Division I women's basketball tournament. Following Wyoming's loss against UCLA, she joined Hamar/Þór and averaged 27.2 points and 13.7 rebounds in 6 games, including a 47 points outburst against Ármann in the playoffs.
- On 15 June, the chairman of the Icelandic Basketball Association, Hannes S. Jónsson, confirmed that Njarðvík would take the seat left vacant by Snæfell in the Úrvalsdeild. KR, which finished last in the Úrvalsdeild during the 2020-21 season, had been offered the seat but declined.
- On 19 June, Helena Sverrisdóttir left Valur aftur three seasons and signed back with her hometown team of Haukar.
- On 29 June, Haukar signed a three-year contract with Sólrún Inga Gísladóttir, who had spent the last four years with the College of Coastal Georgia.
- On 1 July, Breiðablik signed former Snæfell starter Anna Soffía Lárusdóttir who averaged 14.5 points and 6.5 rebounds the previous season.
- On 6 July, Haukar signed Haiden Palmer who led the league in assists the previous season while playing for Snæfell.
- On 11 July, Icelandic national team member Emelía Ósk Gunnarsdóttir confirmed she would be leaving Keflavík and moving to Sweden to continue her education.
- On 12 July, Icelandic national team member Sóllilja Bjarnadóttir confirmed she would be leaving Breiðablik and moving to Sweden to continue her doctorate education.
- On 30 July, Keflavík signed Romania national team member Tünde Kilin.
- On 4 August, Grindavík signed former Arizona State guard Robbi Ryan.
- On 6 August, Sara Rún Hinriksdóttir left Haukar and signed with CS Phoenix Constanța of the Romanian Liga Națională.
- On 6 August, Þóra Kristín Jónsdóttir was reported to have signed with Dameligaen club AKS Falcon after playing the previous nine seasons with Haukar.
- On 21 August, the captain of Keflavík, Erna Hákonardóttir, announced her retirement from basketball after 11 seasons where she won the national championship three times.
- On 15 November, Breiðablik signed former WNBA draft pick Micaela Kelly to replace Chelsey Shumpert.
- On 9 December, the board of Skallagrímur announced that they were withdrawing the team from competition. The team had played 11 games, all losses.
- On 21 December, it was reported that Haiden Denise Palmer had been released by Haukar at her own request after averaging 9.6 points, 9.7 rebounds and 7.6 assists in 7 Úrvalsdeild games.
- On 26 December, Haukar signed Keira Robinson to fill the roster spot left by Haiden Palmer.
- On 3 January, Valur signed Finnish forward Heta Äijänen, who had started the season with Advisora Mataro Maresme in Spain.
- On 26 March, Sigrún Sjöfn Ámundadóttir became the Úrvalsdeild all-time leader in rebounds when she broke Hildur Sigurðardóttir's record of 2,882 career rebounds in a victory against Grindavík.
- On 30 March, Fjölnir clinched the best record in the league and home court advantage throughout the playoffs.
