= Bryndís Guðmundsdóttir =

Icelandic basketball player (born 1988)

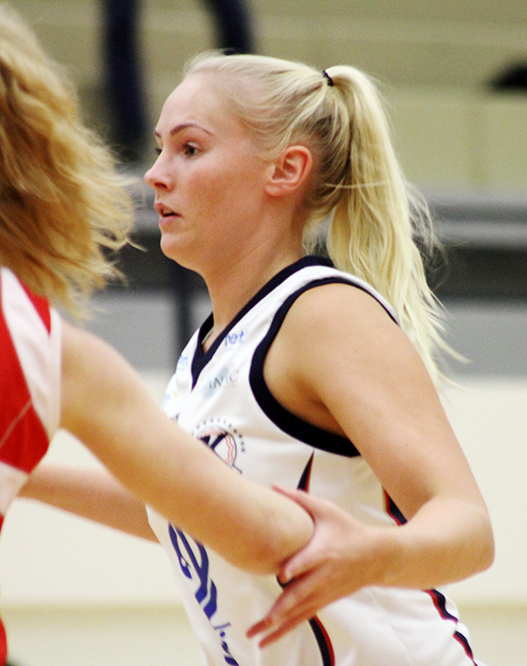
- Bryndís with Keflavík in 2015

Personal information
- Born: 22 July 1988 (age 38) Keflavík, Iceland
- Listed height: 178 cm (5 ft 10 in)

Career information
- Playing career: 2003–2019
- Position: Forward
- Number: 6, 7

Career history
- 2003–2009: Keflavík
- 2009: Royal Charleroi
- 2009–2011: Keflavík
- 2011–2012: KR
- 2012–2015: Keflavík
- 2015–2017: Snæfell
- 2018–2019: Keflavík

Career highlights
- 8× Úrvalsdeild Domestic All-First Team (2005, 2007, 2011, 2013–2016, 2019); 6× Icelandic champion (2004, 2005, 2008, 2011, 2013, 2016); 4× Icelandic Basketball Cup (2004, 2011, 2013, 2016); 9× Icelandic Supercup (2003–2005, 2007, 2008, 2011, 2013, 2016, 2018); 6× Icelandic Company Cup (2003, 2004, 2007, 2008, 2010, 2014); 6× Icelandic All-Star (2005–2007, 2011, 2013, 2014)
Medals
Women's basketball
Representing Iceland
Games of the Small States of Europe
| Silver medal – second place | 2005 Andorra | Team |
| Silver medal – second place | 2009 Cyprus | Team |
| Silver medal – second place | 2013 Luxembourg | Team |
| Silver medal – second place | 2015 Iceland | Team |
| Silver medal – second place | 2019 Bar | Team |
Championship for Small Countries
| Silver medal – second place | 2014 Austria | Team |

Bryndís Guðmundsdóttir (born 22 July 1988) is an Icelandic former basketball player and a former member of the Icelandic women's national basketball team. Over her 15-year career, she won the Icelandic championship six times and the Icelandic Basketball Cup four times.

== Club career ==
After coming up the junior ranks of Keflavík, Bryndís played her first senior games during the 2003–2004 Úrvalsdeild season, averaging 4.1 points in 14 games. She had her breakout season in 2004–2005, averaging 11.6 points and 8.1 rebounds, and was named as the Úrvalsdeild Young Player of the Year and to the Úrvalsdeild Domestic All-First Team. She helped Keflavík to the Úrvalsdeild finals, scoring 21 points in the third and deciding game against ÍS in the semi-finals. In the finals, Keflavík beat Grindavík in three games, winning their third straight national championship.

In November 2007, Bryndís tore a cruciate ligament in her knee, resulting in her missing the rest of the season. In the four games she had played, she averaged 20.0 points, 5.3 rebounds and 3.8 assists.

In August 2009, Bryndís signed with Belgian club Royal SPIRO Monecu Charleroi but left the club in November and rejoined Keflavík.

Bryndís was selected as a starter to the 2011 All-Star game. She averaged 14.0 points, 8.1 rebounds and 3.4 assists during the 2010-2011 regular season and 15,1 points in the playoffs. She was named to the Úrvalsdeild Domestic All-First Team and was a strong candidate for the Domestic Player of the Year award. In May 2011, Bryndís unexpectedly left Keflavík and signed with Reykjavík powerhouse KR.

KR started well, blowing out Keflavík, 84–49, in the Supercup. During the Úrvalsdeild season, KR however underperformed, posting a 13–15 record and missing the playoffs. Bryndís appeared in 21 games for KR during the 2011–2012 season, averaging 10.7 points and 7.3 rebounds per game. After the season, she left KR and signed back with Keflavík.

In January 2013, she was selected to the 2013 All-Star game.

Bryndís missed the first half of the 2014–2015 season for personal reasons but returned to help Keflavík reach the Cup finals and the Úrvalsdeild finals.

In the beginning of the 2015–2016 season, Bryndís developed a rift with newly hired Keflavík head coach Margrét Sturlaugsdóttir which ended with Bryndís reaching an agreement with Keflavík to terminate her contract and Margrét stepping down as assistant coach of the Icelandic national basketball team. Shortly after, Bryndís signed a 2-year contract with the reigning national champions Snæfell. In her first game she scored the game winning basket by lobbing in an inbound pass from Haiden Palmer with 0.3 seconds remaining, giving Snæfell a 95–93 victory over Stjarnan. With Snæfell, she won both the Icelandic Cup and the national championship. She helped Snæfell again to the finals in 2017 where they met her former team Keflavík. In the finals, Keflavík proved to be to strong and won 3–1.

After sitting out the 2017–2018 season due to pregnancy, Bryndís returned to Keflavík in July 2018. For the season, Bryndís averaged 9.7 points and 7.4 rebounds during 2018–19 season, helping Keflavík to the Úrvalsdeild finals, and was named to the Úrvalsdeild Domestic All-First Team for the eight time.

On 30 August 2019, Bryndís announced her retirement from basketball, in part due to problems with her surgically repaired knee.

== National team career ==
Bryndís played 4 games for the Icelandic national basketball team from 2004 to 2018. She won silver with Iceland at the Games of the Small States of Europe in 2005, 2009, 2013 and 2015. In 2014 she won silver with Iceland at the FIBA European Championship for Small Countries.

== Titles, awards and achievements ==
=== Titles ===
- Icelandic champion: 2004, 2005, 2008, 2011, 2013, 2016
- Icelandic Basketball Cup: 2004, 2011, 2013, 2016
- Icelandic Supercup: 2003–2005, 2007, 2008, 2011, 2013, 2016, 2018
- Icelandic Company Cup: 2003, 2004, 2007, 2008, 2010, 2014

=== Awards ===
- Úrvalsdeild Domestic All-First Team: 2005, 2007, 2011, 2013–2016, 2019
- Úrvalsdeild Young Player of the Year: 2005

=== Achievements ===
- Icelandic All-Star game: 2005, 2006, 2011, 2013
