= 2023–24 Úrvalsdeild kvenna (basketball) =

Women's basketball league in Iceland

Subway deild kvenna^{1}
- Duration: 27 September 2023 – 22 May 2024
- Teams: 10
- TV partner: Stöð 2 Sport

Regular season
- Relegated: Snæfell, Breiðablik

Finals
- Champions: Keflavík
- Runners-up: Njarðvík
- Semi-finalists: Stjarnan, Grindavík
- Finals MVP: (Iceland) Sara Rún Hinriksdóttir

Statistical leaders
Points	(Portugal) Raquel Laneiro	24.2
Rebounds	(United States) Maddie Sutton	14.9
Assists	(Portugal) Raquel Laneiro	7.7
- All statistics correct as of 25 May 2024.^{1} Sponsored league name, referring to Úrvalsdeild kvenna.

The 2023–24 Úrvalsdeild kvenna is the 67th season of the Úrvalsdeild kvenna, the top tier women's basketball league on Iceland. The season started on 27 September 2023 and concluded on 22 May 2024 with Keflavík winning the national championship after beating Njarðvík in the Úrvalsdeild finals, 3–0. Sara Rún Hinriksdóttir of Keflavík was named the Finals MVP.

== Competition format ==
Prior to the season the number of teams in the league were increased from 8 to 10 with a 8 team playoff tournament. The bottom team will be relegated to the 1. deild kvenna while the team in 9th place will face the teams in 2-4 place in the 1. deild in a playoff for a spot in the Úrvalsdeild. Rules regarding foreign players were also changed, allowing free flow of players from within the European Economic Area. Previously, only three players from each team without Icelandic citizenship were allowed on the court at the same time.

== Teams ==
Team	City, Region	Arena	Head coach
Breiðablik	Kópavogur	Smárinn	(Spain) Guillermo Sánchez
Grindavík	Grindavík	HS Orku-höllin	(Iceland) Þorleifur Ólafsson
Fjölnir	Grafarvogur	Dalhús	(Iceland) Hallgrímur Brynjólfsson
Haukar	Hafnarfjörður	Schenkerhöllin	(Iceland) Ingvar Þór Guðjónsson
Snæfell	Stykkishólmur	Íþróttahúsið Stykkishólmi	(Iceland) Baldur Þorleifsson
Keflavík	Keflavík	TM Höllin	(Iceland) Sverrir Þór Sverrisson
Njarðvík	Njarðvík	Ljónagryfjan	(Iceland) Rúnar Ingi Erlingsson
Stjarnan	Reykjavík	Mathús Garðabæjar höllin	(Iceland) Arnar Guðjónsson
Valur	Reykjavík	Origo-völlurinn	(Iceland) Hjalti Þór Vilhjálmsson
Þór Akureyri	Akureyri	Síðuskóli	(Iceland) Daníel Andri Halldórsson

=== Managerial changes ===
Team	Outgoing manager	Manner of departure	Date of vacancy	Position in table	Replaced with	Date of appointment
Fjölnir	(Iceland) Kristjana Eir Jónsdóttir	Resigned	15 April 2023	Off-season	(Iceland) Hallgrímur Brynjólfsson	12 May 2023
Breiðablik	(United States) Jeremy Herbert Smith	End of contract	25 April 2023	Off-season	(Iceland) Pétur Ingvarsson	25 April 2023
Keflavík	(Iceland) Hörður Axel Vilhjálmsson	Resigned	3 May 2023	Off-season	(Iceland) Sverrir Þór Sverrisson	21 May 2023
Valur	(Iceland) Ólafur Jónas Sigurðsson	Resigned	8 May 2023	Off-season	(Iceland) Hjalti Þór Vilhjálmsson	13 June 2023
Breiðablik	(Iceland) Pétur Ingvarsson	Resigned	1 June 2023	Off-season	(Spain) Guillermo Sánchez	19 June 2023
Stjarnan	(Iceland) Auður Íris Ólafsdóttir	Resigned	13 December 2023	3rd	(Iceland) Arnar Guðjónsson	13 December 2023
Haukar	(Iceland) Bjarni Magnússon	Resigned	24 January 2024	5th	(Iceland) Ingvar Þór Guðjónsson	24 January 2024

== Notable occurrences ==
- On 17 April, Helena Sverrisdóttir announced that she would play for Haukar after missing most of the 2022–23 season due to injuries.
- On 21 May, Thelma Dís Ágústsdóttir signed with Keflavík after having played for Ball State since 2018.
- On 31 May, it was announced that ÍR had withdrew its team from the league and Snæfell would take its place.
- On 13 June, Valur's player and three-time national champion, Hallveig Jónsdóttir, announced her retirement from basketball.
- On 5 July, Þóra Kristín Jónsdóttir returned to the Úrvalsdeild after two years with AKS Falcon and signed with Haukar.
- On 19 July, Fjölnir signed Portuguese national team member Raquel Laneiro who played for Njarðvík the previous season, averaging 15.7 points, 4.6 rebounds and 5.6 assists per game.
- On 2 August, Njarðvík signed Denmark national team player Emilie Hesseldal who led the Úrvalsdeild in rebounds during the 2019–20 season.
- On 9 September, Stjarnan signed Poland national team member Katarzyna Trzeciak.
- On 10 September, former Iceland national team member Unnur Tara Jónsdóttir returned from a two year absence and signed with Stjarnan after sitting out the previous two seasons.
- On 7 October, Kolbrún María Ármannsdóttir became the youngest player to score 31 or more points in an Úrvalsdeild game at the age of 15 years, 9 months and 9 days, breaking Helena Sverrisdóttir's record from 2004.
- On 19 November, Helena Sverrisdóttir announced her retirement from basketball.
- On 15 December, Breiðablik withdrew its team from the league after several players terminated their contract and left the team. At the time of its withdrawal, the team had lost 12 of its 13 games.
- On 2 January, Grindavík signed Denmark national team member Sarah Mortensen.
- On 16 January, Grindavík signed Dagný Lísa Davíðsdóttir who had been without a team for the first half of the season.
- On 17 January, Keflavík signed five-time Icelandic Female Basketball Player of the Year and Iceland national team member Sara Rún Hinriksdóttir.
- On 24 January, three-time Icelandic Female Basketball Player of the Year, Hildur Björg Kjartansdóttir, announced her retirement from basketball.
- On 7 February, Keflavík sent a formal complaint to the Icelandic Basketball Association, stating that a representative of Njarðvík forged the signature of the vice president of Keflavík on transfer papers for Irena Sól Jónsdóttir, a Keflavík player. The Association rescinded the transfer and Njarðvík later apologised for its actions. The 26 year old Irena Sól, who had resumed her basketball career after pregnancy during the season and averaged 7 minutes in 9 games for Keflavík, announced that since the transfer was denied that she would be retiring from playing basketball.
