= 2020–21 Úrvalsdeild kvenna (basketball) =

Domino's deild kvenna^{1}
- Duration: 23 September 2020 – 2 June 2021
- Games played: 84
- Teams: 8
- TV partner: Stöð 2 Sport

Regular season
- Top seed: Valur
- Relegated: KR

Finals
- Champions: Valur
- Runners-up: Haukar
- Semi-finalists: Keflavík, Fjölnir
- Finals MVP: (Iceland) Helena Sverrisdóttir

Awards
- Domestic MVP: (Iceland) Sara Rún Hinriksdóttir
- Foreign MVP: (Venezuela) Daniela Wallen

Statistical leaders
Points	(Finland) Annika Holopainen	25.9
Rebounds	(Venezuela) Daniela Wallen	17.0
Assists	(United States) Haiden Palmer	7.9

Records
- Biggest home win: Valur 106–52 KR (21 April 2021)
- Biggest away win: Haukar 103–57 KR (8 May 2021)
- Highest scoring: Haukar 120–77 KR (10 March 2021)
- Winning streak: Keflavík (9 games)
- Losing streak: Snæfell (11 games)
- All statistics correct as of 3 June 2021.^{1} Sponsored league name, referring to Úrvalsdeild kvenna.

The 2020–21 Úrvalsdeild kvenna is the 64th season of the Úrvalsdeild kvenna, the top tier women's basketball league on Iceland. The season started on 23 September 2020. On 7 October, the Icelandic Basketball Association postponed the season for two weeks do to another Coronavirus outbreak in Iceland. It concluded on 2 June 2021 with Valur winning their second title after beating Haukar 3–0 in the Úrvalsdeild finals.

== Competition format ==
The participating teams first play a conventional round-robin schedule with every team playing each opponent twice "home" and twice "away" for a total of 28 games. The top four teams qualify for the championship playoffs whilst the bottom team will be relegated to 1. deild kvenna.

== Teams ==
Team	City, Region	Arena	Head coach
Breiðablik	Kópavogur	Smárinn	(Iceland) Ívar Ásgrímsson
Fjölnir	Grafarvogur	Dalhús	(Iceland) Halldór Karl Þórisson
Haukar	Hafnarfjörður	Schenkerhöllin	(Iceland) Bjarni Magnússon
Keflavík	Keflavík	TM Höllin	(Iceland) Jón Halldór Eðvaldsson
KR	Reykjavík	DHL-Höllin	(Spain) Francisco Garcia
Skallagrímur	Borgarnes	Fjósið	(Iceland) Guðrún Ósk Ámundadóttir
Snæfell	Stykkishólmur	Fjárhúsið	(Iceland) Halldór Steingrímsson
Valur	Reykjavík	Origo-völlurinn	(Iceland) Ólafur Jónas Sigurðsson

=== Managerial changes ===
Team	Outgoing manager	Manner of departure	Date of vacancy	Position in table	Replaced with	Date of appointment
Snæfell	(Iceland) Gunnlaugur Smárason	End of contract	13 March 2020	Off-season	(Iceland) Halldór Steingrímsson	28 May 2020
Valur	(Iceland) Darri Freyr Atlason	Resigned	4 May 2020	Off-season	(Iceland) Ólafur Jónas Sigurðsson	4 May 2020
KR	(Iceland) Benedikt Guðmundsson	Resigned	11 May 2020	Off-season	(Spain) Francisco Garcia	25 May 2020
KR	(Spain) Francisco Garcia	Fired	5 October 2020	8th	(United States) Mike Denzel	5 October 2020

== Regular season ==
Pos	Team	Pld	W	L	PF	PA	PD	Pts	Qualification or relegation
1	Valur	21	18	3	1623	1302	+321	36	Qualification to playoffs
2	Haukar	21	15	6	1560	1392	+168	30	Qualification to playoffs
3	Keflavík	21	14	7	1647	1527	+120	28	Qualification to playoffs
4	Fjölnir	21	14	7	1661	1536	+125	28	Qualification to playoffs
5	Breiðablik	21	8	13	1395	1437	−42	16	
6	Skallagrímur	21	8	13	1473	1573	−100	16	
7	Snæfell	21	5	16	1516	1676	−160	10	Withdrew from the Úrvalsdeild after the season
8	KR	21	2	19	1396	1828	−432	4	Relegated

Updated to match(es) played on 8 May 2021. Source: kki.is

Note: Valur was awarded a 20-0 victory against Breiðablik due to the later using a player that was serving a 1 game suspension. Breiðablik originally won the game 71-67.

== Playoffs ==
The playoffs are played between the four first qualified teams with a 1-1-1-1-1 format, playing seeded teams games 1, 3 and 5 at home.

=== Bracket ===
Semifinals
1	Valur	3
4	Fjölnir	0
2	Haukar	3
3	Keflavík	0

Finals
1	Valur	3
2	Haukar	0

Updated to match(es) played on 21 May 2021. Source: KKÍ

=== Semifinals ===
Team 1	Series	Team 2	Game 1	Game 2	Game 3	Game 4	Game 5
Valur	3–0	Fjölnir	90–49	83–76	78–74		
Haukar	3–0	Keflavík	77–63	80–68	80–50		

=== Final ===
Team 1	Series	Team 2	Game 1	Game 2	Game 3	Game 4	Game 5
Valur	3–0	Haukar	58–45	71–65	74–65		

== Notable occurrences ==
- On 1 April, Snæfell's star player Gunnhildur Gunnarsdóttir announced her retirement from basketball.
- On 6 May, it was announced that Haukar player Sigrún Björg Ólafsdóttir would be leaving the team and attend the University of Tennessee.
- On 6 May, it was reported that Keflavík starter Þóranna Kika Hodge-Carr would attend Iona College and play for the Iona Gaels women's basketball team.
- On 13 May, Hildur Björg Kjartansdóttir left KR and signed with Reykjavík rivals Valur.
- On 15 May, KR's star Danielle Rodriguez announced that she was retiring from playing professionally to fully focus on her coaching career.
- On 15 May, Fjölnir announced it had signed Lithuanian national team member Lina Pikčiūtė.
- On 15 May, Embla Kristínardóttir signed with reigning Icelandic Cup champions Skallagrímur after playing for Fjölnir the previous season.
- On 17 June, Skallagrímur signed Sanja Orozović from KR.
- On 25 June, Haiden Palmer signed with Snæfell with whom she won the national championship in 2016.
- On 9 July, Haukar signed Bríet Sif Hinriksdóttir and Elísabeth Ýr Ægisdóttir from Grindavík.
- On 7 August, Valur signed Eydís Eva Þórisdóttir and former national team players Jóhanna Björk Sveinsdóttir and Auður Íris Ólafsdóttir.
- On 19 August, Fjölnir signed Irish national team member Fiona O'Dwyer.
- On 21 August, KR announced that it had signed Finnish national team member Annika Holopainen and American Taryn McCutcheon.
- On 3 September, KR announced that former national team players Margrét Kara Sturludóttir and Unnur Tara Jónsdóttir had retired from basketball.
- On 17 September, Fjölnir announced that it had signed Ariana Moorer to replace injured Areil Hearn. Moorer had previously played in the Úrvalsdeild during the 2016–17 season when she helped Keflavík win the national championship and the Icelandic Cup.
- On 27 September, all players of Keflavík and KR where quarantined and their next games postponed after one of the players from their game on 23 September was diagnosed with COVID-19.
- On 28 September, the Icelandic Basketball Association (KKÍ) ruled that Breiðablik would have to forfeit its unexpected win against defending champions Valur in the first game of the season and be fined 250.000 ISK for using a suspended player in the game. On 11 March 2020, Breiðablik's Fanney Lind Thomas was suspended one game by KKÍ's disciplinary court for two technical fouls and excessive complaining to a referee. Two days later the rest of the 2019–20 season was canceled due to the coronavirus pandemic in Iceland. Per KKÍ rules, Fanney would have to serve her suspension in the first game of the 2020–21 season.
- On 5 October, KR fired head coach Francisco Garcia after only two games, both losses. In his place, the team hired Mike Denzel who had previously served as an assistant coach to Stew Johnson for the KR men's team, and Guðrún Arna Sigurðardóttir as his assistant coach. Until Denzel's arrival, Jóhannes Árnason was appointed as an interim coach.
- On 7 October, the season was postponed for two weeks due to another outbreak of Covid-19 in Iceland.
- On 2 January, Fjölnir announced it had released American Fiona O'Dwyer at her own request and signed Portuguese national team player Sara Djassi in her place.
- On 24 February, Sóllilja Bjarnadóttir scored 28 points, including 17 points in a row, for Breiðablik in a victory against KR.
- On 25 February, Icelandic national team member Sara Rún Hinriksdóttir signed with Haukar, rejoining with her twin sister Bríet Sif.
- On 1 March, it was announced that Icelandic national team member Sigrún Björg Ólafsdóttir would join Fjölnir when her season with the University of Tennessee at Chattanooga would end.
- On 11 March, Isabella Ósk Sigurðardóttir grabbed 28 rebounds while also scoring 21 points in a 93-76 victory against Snæfell. It was the most rebounds by an Icelandic player in the history of the Úrvalsdeild.
- On 10 May, it was announced that Thelma Dís Ágústsdóttir would finish the season with Keflavík.
