= Úrvalsdeild Women's Playoffs MVP =

Úrvalsdeild Women's Playoffs MVP is an Icelandic basketball award which is awarded annually to the player judged most valuable to his team during the Úrvalsdeild playoffs.

== Winners ==
The following is a list of the recent Úrvalsdeild Women's Playoffs MVP's.

§	Player's team lost the Úrvalsdeild Finals
Player (X)	Denotes the number of times the player has received the Playoffs MVP award
Team (X)	Denotes the number of times a player from this team has received the Playoffs MVP award

Year	Player	Position	Nationality	Team
1994–1995	Penny Peppas	Point guard	USA	Breiðablik
2004–2005	Alexandria Stewart	Guard	USA	Keflavík
2005–2006	Megan Mahoney	Forward	USA	Haukar
2006–2007	Helena Sverrisdóttir	Forward	Iceland	Haukar (2x)
2007–2008	TaKesha Watson	Guard	USA	Keflavík
2008–2009	Slavica Dimovska	Point guard	Macedonia	Haukar (3x)
2009–2010	Unnur Tara Jónsdóttir	Forward	Iceland	KR
2010–2011	Pálína Gunnlaugsdóttir	Guard	Iceland	Keflavík
2011–2012	Lele Hardy	Center	USA	Njarðvík
2012–2013	Pálína Gunnlaugsdóttir (2x)	Guard	Iceland	Keflavík
2013–2014	Hildur Sigurðardóttir	Guard	Iceland	Snæfell
2014–2015	Kristen McCarthy	Forward	USA	Snæfell (2x)
2015–2016	Haiden Denise Palmer	Guard	USA	Snæfell (3x)
2016–2017	Ariana Moorer	Guard	USA	Keflavík
2017–2018	Helena Sverrisdóttir (2x)	Forward	Iceland	Haukar (4x)
2018–2019	Helena Sverrisdóttir (3x)	Forward	Iceland	Valur
2019–2020	None selected after season was canceled due to the coronavirus pandemic in Iceland			
2020–2021	Helena Sverrisdóttir (4x)	Forward	Iceland	Valur
2021–2022	Aliyah Collier	Guard	USA	Njarðvík
2022–2023	Kiana Johnson	Point guard	USA	Valur
2023–2024	Sara Rún Hinriksdóttir	Forward	ISL	Keflavík
2024–2025	Þóra Kristín Jónsdóttir	Guard	ISL	Haukar
2025–2026	Danielle Rodriguez	Guard	ISL	Njarðvík
