= Berglind Gunnarsdóttir =

Icelandic basketball player (born 1993)

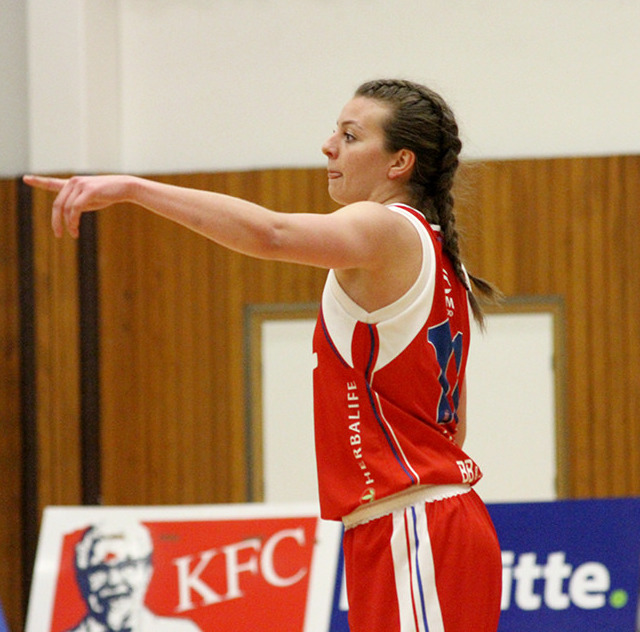

Personal information
- Born: 17 February 1993 (age 33)
- Listed height: 175 cm (5 ft 9 in)

Career information
- Playing career: 2007–2020
- Position: Guard
- Number: 11
- Coaching career: 2021–present

Career history

Playing
- 2007–2020: Snæfell

Coaching
- 2021–2022: Valur (assistant)

Career highlights
- Úrvalsdeild Domestic All-First Team (2017); 3x Icelandic champion (2014–2016); Icelandic Basketball Cup (2016); 4x Icelandic Supercup (2012, 2014–2016)
Medals
Women's basketball
Representing Iceland
Games of the Small States of Europe
Silver medal – second place	2015 Reykjavík	Team
Silver medal – second place	2017 San Marino	Team
Silver medal – second place	2019 Bar	Team

Berglind Lára Gunnarsdóttir (born 17 February 1993) is an Icelandic basketball coach and former player who played 26 games for the Icelandic national basketball team. She spent her entire playing career with Snæfell where she won three straight national championships from 2014 to 2016 and the Icelandic Basketball Cup in 2016. In 2017, she was named to the Úrvalsdeild Domestic All-First Team.

== Career ==
=== First years ===
Berglind came up through the junior ranks of Snæfell, playing her first senior match during the 2007–2008 season in the second-tier 1. deild kvenna where she helped the club to a perfect 16–0 season and a promotion to the top-tier Úrvalsdeild kvenna.

Injuries plagued her next few seasons, she tore a cruciate ligament in her knee which required two operations and during the 2012–2013 season she repeatedly dislocated her shoulder after having initially injured it during the summer.

=== Snæfell's rise to the top ===
Berglind helped Snæfell reach the Icelandic Cup finals in 2014 but missed the game due to a knee injury. Without her, Snæfell lost 70–78 to Haukar. On April 6, she helped Snæfell win its first ever women's national championship after sweeping Haukar 3–0 in the Úrvalsdeild finals.

She won the national championship with Snæfell again in 2015, playing in all but one of Snæfell's games during the playoffs despite dislocating her shoulder in the semi-finals and again in the finals. In 2016, Snæfell won the championship for the third year in a row, beating Haukar 3–1 in the finals. She had 11 points and 4 rebounds in the title clinching game.

Berglind had a breakout season in 2016–2017, averaging 11.6 points and 5.3 rebounds and being named to the Úrvalsdeild kvenna Domestic All-First Team. She helped Snæfell post the best record during the regular season and once again make it to the Úrvalsdeild finals against Keflavík. In the finals, Keflavík proved to be to strong and won 3–1.

On 10 December 2017 she scored the game winning layup, after rebounding her own miss, at the buzzer to beat Valur in the final eight of the Basketball Cup. On 28 February 2018 Berglind dislocated her shoulder once again in a loss against Keflavík. In 26 games, she averaged 8.3 points and 3.1 rebounds per game.

=== Accident ===
After participating with the national team at the 2019 Games of the Small States of Europe in May 2019, Berglind underwent a surgery on her troublesome shoulder and was expected to miss the first half of the 2019–20 season. Shortly before her expected return, on 10 January 2020, she was involved in a serious accident after a bus she was traveling in, along with more than 40 college students, slid off the road in icy conditions and landed upside down. In the accident, she suffered serious neck and spinal injuries, leaving her partially paralyzed. In August 2020, she had regained the use of her legs.

== National team career ==
Berglind was first selected to the Icelandic national basketball team in 2015 and in total she played 26 games for the team. She was selected to the national team for the EuroBasket Women 2017 qualification where Iceland finished third in its group. In November 2017 she was selected to the team for the EuroBasket Women 2019 qualification. In May 2019 she participated at the 2019 Games of the Small States of Europe where Iceland finished in second place.

In 2023, she began serving as the women's national team doctor.

== Coaching career ==
In August 2021, Berglind was hired as an assistant coach by reigning Úrvalsdeild kvenna champions Valur.

== Personal life ==
Berglind's sister is basketball player Gunnhildur Gunnarsdóttir, who played for Snæfell and the Icelandic national team.

In 2021, Berglind worked as an analyst on the basketball postgame show Domino's Körfuboltakvöld.

== Awards, titles and accomplishments ==
=== Individual awards ===
- Úrvalsdeild Domestic All-First Team: 2017

=== Titles ===
- Icelandic champion (3): 2014, 2015, 2016
- Icelandic Basketball Cup: 2016
- Icelandic Supercup (4): 2012, 2014, 2015, 2016
- Icelandic Company Cup : 2012
- Icelandic Division I: 2008

=== Accomplishments ===
- Icelandic All-Star game: 2011
