= 2019–20 Úrvalsdeild kvenna (basketball) =

Domino's deild kvenna^{1}
- Duration: 2 October 2019 – 18 March 2020
- Games played: 99
- Teams: 8
- TV partner: Stöð 2 Sport

Regular season
- Top seed: Valur
- Relegated: Grindavík

Statistical leaders
Points	(United States) Danni L. Williams	33.1
Rebounds	(Denmark) Emilie Hesseldal	13.8
Assists	(United States) Kiana Johnson	8.2

Records
- Biggest home win: Valur 107–41 Skallagrímur (19 February 2020)
- Biggest away win: Valur 96–49 Grindavík (2 October 2019)
- Highest scoring: Valur 110–75 Snæfell (9 October 2019)
- Winning streak: 11 games Valur
- Losing streak: 13 games Grindavík
- All statistics correct as of 18 March 2020.^{1} Sponsored league name, referring to Úrvalsdeild kvenna.

The 2019–20 Úrvalsdeild kvenna is the 63rd season of the Úrvalsdeild kvenna, the top tier women's basketball league on Iceland. The season started on 2 October 2019. On 13 March 2020 the season was postponed for at least four weeks due to the coronavirus outbreak in the country. On 18 March, the rest of the season was canceled. Grindavík was relegated and Valur was named divisional champions for having the best record at the time of the cancelation but no national champions would be named for the season.

== Competition format ==
The participating teams first play a conventional round-robin schedule with every team playing each opponent twice "home" and twice "away" for a total of 28 games. The top four teams qualify for the championship playoffs whilst the bottom team will be relegated to 1. deild kvenna.

== Teams ==
Team	City, Region	Arena	Head coach
Breiðablik	Kópavogur	Smárinn	(Iceland) Ívar Ásgrímsson
Grindavík	Grindavík	Smárinn	(Iceland) Jóhann Árni Ólafsson
Haukar	Hafnarfjörður	Schenkerhöllin	(Iceland) Ólöf Helga Pálsdóttir
Keflavík	Keflavík	TM Höllin	(Iceland) Jón Halldór Eðvaldsson
KR	Reykjavík	DHL-Höllin	(Iceland) Benedikt Guðmundsson
Skallagrímur	Borgarnes	Fjósið	(Iceland) Guðrún Ósk Ámundadóttir
Snæfell	Stykkishólmur	Fjárhúsið	(Iceland) Baldur Þorleifsson
Valur	Reykjavík	Origo-völlurinn	(Iceland) Darri Freyr Atlason

=== Managerial changes ===
Team	Outgoing manager	Manner of departure	Date of vacancy	Position in table	Replaced with	Date of appointment
Snæfell	(Iceland) Baldur Þorleifsson	End of contract	March 2019	Off-season	(Iceland) Gunnlagur Smárason	25 May 2019
Keflavík	(Iceland) Jón Guðmundsson	Resigned	30 April 2019	Off-season	(Iceland) Jón Halldór Eðvaldsson	8 May 2019
Breiðablik	(Spain) Antonio D’Albero	End of contract	18 June 2019	Off-season	(Iceland) Ívar Ásgrímsson	18 June 2019
Skallagrímur	(Serbia) Biljana Stanković	End of contract	2019	Off-season	(Iceland) Guðrún Ósk Ámundadóttir	September 2019
Haukar	(Iceland) Ólöf Helga Pálsdóttir	Fired	20 February 2020	5th	(Iceland) Bjarni Magnússon (interim)	20 February 2020
Haukar	(Iceland) Bjarni Magnússon	Interim coach	11 March 2020	5th	(Iceland) Ari Gunnarsson	11 March 2020

== Regular season ==
Pos	Team	Pld	W	L	PF	PA	PD	Pts	Qualification or relegation
1	Valur	25	22	3	2164	1671	+493	44	Division champions^{1}
2	KR	25	18	7	1903	1635	+268	36	
3	Keflavík	24	16	8	1795	1709	+86	32	
4	Skallagrímur	25	15	10	1686	1713	−27	30	
5	Haukar	25	14	11	1810	1738	+72	28	
6	Snæfell	24	8	16	1633	1852	−219	16	
7	Breiðablik	25	4	21	1636	1984	−348	8	
8	Grindavík	25	2	23	1600	1925	−325	4	Relegated

Updated to match(es) played on 18 March 2020. Source: kki.is

Notes
^{1} As the playoffs were canceled, no team won the national championship. The team with the best record in the league receives the title Division champions (Icelandic: Deildarmeistarar). Stjarnan received the title as it had the best record at the time of cancelation.

== Notable occurrences ==
- On April 12, it was reported that Haukar had signed Lovísa Björt Henningsdóttir for the 2019–20 season; she had played the previous four seasons for Marist College of the Metro Atlantic Athletic Conference.
- On May 13, two-time Icelandic Women's Basketball Player of the Year, Hildur Björg Kjartansdóttir, signed a one-year contract with KR.
- On May 15, it was reported that Keflavík owed the Icelandic Basketball Association 3 million ISK in unpaid transfer and referee fees and would lose their spot in the Úrvalsdeild if the debt would not be paid by May 30.
- On May 24, reigning national champions Valur signed Sylvía Rún Hálfdánardóttir who the previous season played with Þór Akureyri in the 1. deild kvenna where she was named to the Domestic All-First team after averaging 21.3 points, 12.7 rebounds and 5.1 assist per game.
- On June 7, Stjarnan withdrew from the Úrvalsdeild and registered for the second-tier 1. deild kvenna.
- On June 18, it was reported that Breiðablik would take Stjarnan's place in the league.
- On June 20, reigning Úrvalsdeild Foreign Player of the Year and two-time Úrvalsdeild assist leader, Danielle Rodriguez, signed with KR after playing the last three seasons with Stjarnan.
- On June 26, Snæfell signed Finnish national team player Veera Pirttinen.
- On July 1, Snæfell signed Chandler Smith from Gonzaga University to replace Kristen McCarthy who was still recovering from a concussion she received in March 2019.
- On July 8, Valur signed former KR point guard Kiana Johnson.
- On July 9, Grindavík signed Icelandic national team player Bríet Sif Hinriksdóttir. Bríet played the previous season with Stjarnan where she averaged 13.4 points 4.3 rebounds per game and was named to the Úrvalsdeild Domestic All-First Team.
- On August 23, it was reported that KR had signed Sanja Orozović who the previous season had averaged 20.6 points, 7.5 rebounds and 3.7 assists for Breiðablik.
- On August 30, former Icelandic national team and Keflavík's player, Bryndís Guðmundsdóttir, announced her retirement from basketball.
- On 8 September 2019, Benedikt Guðmundsson, the head coach of KR, confirmed that Margrét Kara Sturludóttir was training with the club with the possibility signing with the team. She last played for Stjarnan during the 2015–2016 season when she averaged 10.9 points, 12.5 rebounds and 4.1 assists per game.
- On September 9, Skallagrímur announced the signing of Danish national team member Emilie Hesseldal. She played previously for Vitória S.C. and led the Portuguese Liga Feminina de Basquetebol in rebounds the previous two seasons.
- On October 16, in a game between KR and Valur, Unnur Tara Jónsdóttir, who is a practicing medical doctor outside of basketball, was involved in a controversy with referee Ísak Ernir Kristinsson after she requested permission to enter the court during a stoppage to attend to a teammate who had been suffered a serious leg injury after a hard landing moments before. Ísak denied her the permission and gave her a technical foul after she indicated that she would then ask one of the other referees at the game for permission instead. After the incident caused an uproar with fans, the Icelandic Basketball Association Referee Committee issued a statement where it stated that Ísak admitted that it had been a mistake on his behalf to deny Unnur permission to attend to her injured teammate and that the Committee agreed with that assessment.
- On January 10, Snæfell's forward Berglind Gunnarsdóttir was involved in a serious accident after a bus she was traveling in, along with more than 40 college students, slid off the road in icy conditions and landed upside down. In the accident, she suffered serious neck and spinal injuries, leaving her partially paralyzed.
