= Telma Björk Fjalarsdóttir =

Icelandic former basketball player (born 1984)

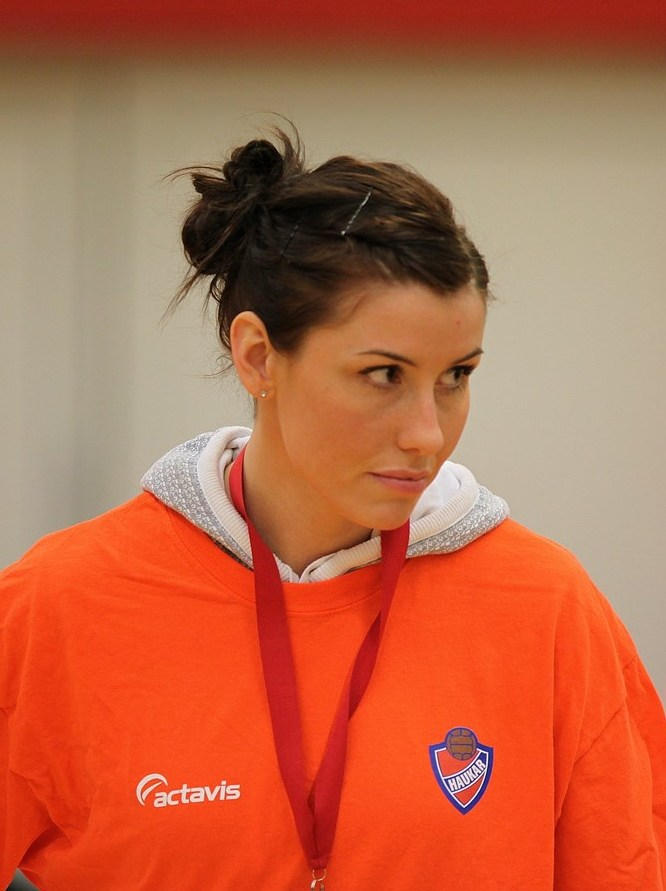
- Telma Björk in 2009

Personal information
- Born: 6 October 1984 (age 42) Iceland
- Listed height: 181 cm (5 ft 11 in)

Career information
- Playing career: 2004–2011
- Position: Center

Career history
- 2004–2006: KR
- 2006–2007: Breiðablik
- 2007–2011: Haukar

Career highlights
- Icelandic champion (2009); Icelandic Cup (2010); 4× Icelandic All-Star (2006–2009)

Telma Björk Fjalarsdóttir (born 6 October 1984) is an Icelandic former basketball player and a former member of the Icelandic national basketball team. During her career she won the Icelandic championship and the Icelandic Cup as a member of Haukar.

== Playing career ==
After starting her career with KR, Telma played for Breiðablik during the 2006–07 season where she averaged 11.1 points and 10.9 rebounds per game. The following season she signed with Haukar. During her first season with Haukar, she averaged 7.7 points and 10.8 rebounds per game. In 2009, she helped Haukar reach the Úrvalsdeild finals where they beat KR 3–2. She was the captain of the Haukar team when it won the Icelandic Cup in 2010, posting 10 points and 11 rebounds in the 83–77 Cup Finals win against Keflavík. The following season, she missed all but 6 games, mostly due to an ankle injury.

In May 2011, Telma signed with Valur but did not appear in any games for the team. She again attempted a comeback in 2015 with Stjarnan without appearing in any games.

== Icelandic national team ==
In 2009, Telma played 5 games for the Icelandic national basketball team.
