= 2021–22 Icelandic Women's Basketball Cup =

2021–2022 Bikarkeppni Kvenna
Tournament details
- Arena: Smárinn (cup final); Kópavogur, Iceland
- Dates: 17 October 2021 – 19 March 2022

Final positions
- Champions: Haukar
- Runners-up: Breiðablik

Awards and statistics
- MVP: (Iceland) Helena Sverrisdóttir

The 2021–2022 Bikarkeppni kvenna, referred to as VÍS bikarinn for sponsorship reasons, was the 48th edition of the Icelandic Women's Basketball Cup, won by Haukar against Breiðablik. The competition was managed by the Icelandic Basketball Association (KKÍ) and the cup final was played in Smárinn, Kópavogur, and broadcast live on RÚV. Helena Sverrisdóttir was named the Cup Finals MVP after turning in 19 points, 15 rebounds and 9 assists.

== Participating teams ==
18 teams signed up for the Cup tournament.

== Final four ==
Semifinals
17 March
Snæfell	55
Breiðablik	89
17 March
Njarðvík	55
Haukar	83

Final
19 March
Breiðablik	81
Haukar	88

== Cup Finals MVP ==
Pos.	Player	Team
Forward	(Iceland) Helena Sverrisdóttir	Haukar
