= Gunnhildur Gunnarsdóttir =

Icelandic basketball player (born 1990)

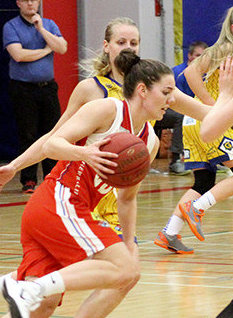
- Gunnhildur with Snæfell during the 2014-15 season.

Personal information
- Born: 7 August 1990 (age 36)
- Listed height: 176 cm (5 ft 9 in)

Career information
- Playing career: 2006–2022
- Position: Guard

Career history

Playing
- 2006–2010: Snæfell
- 2010–2014: Haukar
- 2014–2020: Snæfell
- 2021–2022: Snæfell

Coaching
- 2020–2023: Snæfell (assistant)

Career highlights
- Icelandic Women's Basketball Player of the Year (2016); 3x Úrvalsdeild Domestic All-First Team (2015, 2016, 2019); 2x Úrvalsdeild Defensive Player of the Year (2015, 2016); 2x Icelandic champion (2015, 2016); 2× Icelandic Basketball Cup (2014, 2016); 3x Icelandic Supercup (2014–2016)
Medals
Women's basketball
Representing Iceland
Games of the Small States of Europe
Silver medal – second place	2013 Luxembourg	Team
Silver medal – second place	2015 Reykjavík	Team
Silver medal – second place	2017 San Marino	Team
Silver medal – second place	2019 Bar	Team

Gunnhildur Gunnarsdóttir (born 7 August 1990) is an Icelandic basketball player and a former member of the Icelandic national basketball team. During her career, she won the Icelandic championship and the Icelandic Cup twice each. In 2016, she was named the Icelandic Women's Basketball Player of the Year.

== Career ==
Gunnhildur played with Haukar from 2010 to 2014 and helped the club to the Úrvalsdeild finals twice, in 2012 when it lost to Njarðvík and in 2014 when it lost to her hometown team of Snæfell.

She helped Snæfell to the 2015 Úrvalsdeild finals, her third finals trip in four years. After the season she was named as the Úrvalsdeild Defensive Player of the Year and to the Úrvalsdeild Domestic All-First Team.

Gunnhildur helped Snæfell win the Icelandic Supercup on October 11, 2015. On November 25, she injured her shoulder in a national game against Slovakia and missed eight weeks.

In May 2016, she signed a contract extension with Snæfell for the 2016–2017 season. In December 2016, Gunnhildur was named the Icelandic Women's Basketball Player of the Year, ending Helena Sverrisdóttir's eleven-year reign.

After the 2017 finals, Gunnhildur revealed that she was pregnant and as a result would miss most of the coming season.

Gunnhildur averaged 11.6 points and 5.5 rebounds during 2018–19 season and was named to the Úrvalsdeild Domestic All-First Team for the third time.

She announced her retirement from basketball in April 2020 but returned to the court with Snæfell in October 2021, posting 16 points and 10 rebounds in a victory against Stjarnan on 12 October.

== Icelandic national team ==
Gunnhildur was first selected to the Icelandic national basketball team in 2012. In total she played 36 games for the team.

== Personal life ==
Gunnhildur's sister is basketball player Berglind Gunnarsdóttir, who played for Snæfell and the Icelandic national team.

== Awards, titles and accomplishments ==
=== Individual awards ===
- Icelandic Women's Basketball Player of the Year: 2016
- Úrvalsdeild Domestic All-First Team (3): 2015, 2016, 2019
- Úrvalsdeild Defensive Player of the Year (2): 2015, 2016

=== Titles ===
- Icelandic champion (2): 2015, 2016
- Icelandic Basketball Cup (2): 2014, 2016
- Icelandic Supercup (3): 2014, 2015, 2016
- Icelandic Company Cup : 2011
- Icelandic Division I: 2008

=== Accomplishments ===
- Icelandic All-Star game (2): 2010, 2011
