= Bjarni Már Magnússon =

- Education: Law
- Alma mater: University of Iceland; Edinburgh Law School; University of Miami
- Occupation: Professor at Law
- Employer: Reykjavík University
- Spouse: Hildur Sigurðardóttir
- Basketball career

Career history
- 1996–1998: Þór Akureyri
- 2000–2001: Íþróttafélag Stúdenta

Bjarni Már Magnússon born in Gothenburg Sweden 16 September 1979 is an Icelandic Professor of Law and dean of the faculty of law at Bifröst University. He specialises in international law, mainly the international law of the sea. He sits on the Icelandic Climate Council.

== Personal life ==
Bjarni is married to Hildur Sigurðardóttir, one of the greatest basketball players in Iceland's sports history and a former member of the Icelandic national basketball team. He played for Þór Akureyri in the Icelandic top-tier Úrvalsdeild karla. During the 2000–2001 season, he averaged 14.8 points for Íþróttafélag Stúdenta in the second-tier 1. deild karla.
