= Snæfell (women's basketball) =

- Leagues: 1. deild kvenna
- Founded: 1964; 61 years ago
- History: Snæfell; 1964–present
- Arena: Íþróttahúsið Stykkishólmi
- Location: Stykkishólmur, Iceland
- Team colors: Red, White, Blue
- Championships: 3 Úrvalsdeild kvenna
- Website: snaefell.is
| Home | Away |

The Snæfell women's basketball team, commonly known as Snæfell, is the women's basketball department of Ungmennafélagið Snæfell, based in Stykkishólmur, Iceland.

== History ==
Snæfell's women's team first played in Úrvalsdeild kvenna during the 2008–09 season after winning 1. deild kvenna the previous season with a perfect record. It won the national championship for three straight seasons, from 2014 to 2016, and the Icelandic Basketball Cup in 2016. They furthermore won the Supercup in 2012 and from 2014 to 2016. On 2 June 2021, the club announced that it would not take its seat in the Úrvalsdeild for the 2021–22 season and register it in the second-tier 1. deild kvenna.

After two years in the 1. deild kvenna, the team gained promotion back to the Úrvalsdeild for the 2023–24 season following its expansion from 8 teams to 10 and ÍR's folding. Following the season, it was relegated back to the 1. deild.

On 11 December 2024, the team withdrew from the 1. deild after posting a 2–5 record in the first 7 games. It had previously forfeited its game in the Icelandic Cup a few days earlier.

== Season by season ==
| Season | Tier | League | Pos. | W–L | Playoffs | Icelandic Cup |
|---|---|---|---|---|---|---|
| 1995–96 | 2 | 1. deild kvenna | 2nd | 6–3 | N/A | DNP |
did not participate
| 2001–02 | 2 | 1. deild kvenna | 5th | 7–9 | N/A | DNP |
did not participate
| 2006–07 | 2 | 1. deild kvenna | 3rd | 11–5 | N/A | 2nd round |
| 2007–08 | 2 | 1. deild kvenna | 1st | 16–0 | N/A | 2nd Round |
| 2008–09 | 1 | Úrvalsdeild kvenna | 7th | 5–14 | DNQ | 1st Round |
| 2009–10 | 1 | Úrvalsdeild kvenna | 7th | 3–11 | DNQ | 1st Round |
| 2010–11 | 1 | Úrvalsdeild kvenna | 6th | 6–8 | 1st Round | 1st Round |
| 2011–12 | 1 | Úrvalsdeild kvenna | 3rd | 16–12 | 1st Round | Runner-up |
| 2012–13 | 1 | Úrvalsdeild kvenna | 2nd | 21–7 | SF | SF |
| 2013–14 | 1 | Úrvalsdeild kvenna | 1st | 25–3 | Champions | Runner-up |
| 2014–15 | 1 | Úrvalsdeild kvenna | 1st | 25–3 | Champions | SF |
| 2015–16 | 1 | Úrvalsdeild kvenna | 2nd | 21–3 | Champions | Winners |
| 2016–17 | 1 | Úrvalsdeild kvenna | 1st | 22–6 | Runner-up | SF |
| 2017–18 | 1 | Úrvalsdeild kvenna | 6th | 12–16 | DNQ | SF |
| 2018–19 | 1 | Úrvalsdeild kvenna | 5th | 16-12 | DNQ | SF |
| 2019–20 | 1 | Úrvalsdeild kvenna | 6th | 8-16 | Canceled | 1st round |
| 2020–21 | 1 | Úrvalsdeild kvenna | 7th | 5-16 | DNQ | |
| 2021–22 | 2 | 1. deild kvenna | 6th | 11-9 | DNQ | SF |
| 2022–23 | 2 | 1. deild kvenna | 3rd | 17-3 | SF | SF |
| 2023–24 | 1 | Úrvalsdeild kvenna | 9th | 2-20 | DNQ | 1st round |
| 2024–25 | 2 | 1. deild kvenna | Folded | 2-5 | DNQ | 1st round |

== Trophies and awards ==
=== Trophies ===
- Úrvalsdeild kvenna:
  - Winners (3): 2014, 2015, 2016.
  - Runners-up (1): 2017
- Icelandic Basketball Cup (1):
  - Winners (1): 2016
  - Runners-up (2): 2012, 2014
- Icelandic Super Cup:
  - Winners (4): 2012, 2014, 2015, 2016
- Icelandic Company Cup (1):
  - Winners (1): 2012
- 1. deild kvenna:
  - Winners (1): 2008

=== Awards ===
Úrvalsdeild kvenna Domestic Player of the Year

- Hildur Sigurðardóttir – 2014, 2015

Úrvalsdeild kvenna Foreign Player of the Year

- Haiden Denise Palmer – 2016
- Kristen McCarthy – 2015

Úrvalsdeild kvenna Domestic All-First Team

- Berglind Gunnarsdóttir – 2017
- Bryndís Guðmundsdóttir – 2016
- Gunnhildur Gunnarsdóttir – 2015, 2016
- Hildur Sigurðardóttir – 2012, 2013, 2014, 2015
- Hildur Björg Kjartansdóttir – 2013, 2014

Úrvalsdeild kvenna Defensive Player of the Year

- Guðrún Gróa Þorsteinsdóttir – 2015
- Gunnhildur Gunnarsdóttir – 2015, 2016

Úrvalsdeild kvenna Coach of the Year

- Ingi Þór Steinþórsson – 2014, 2015, 2016

== Notable players ==
Criteria

To appear in this section a player must have either:

- Played at least three seasons for the club.
- Set a club record or won an individual award while at the club.
- Played at least one official international match for their national team at any time.
- Played at least one official WNBA match at any time.

- (Iceland) Alda Leif Jónsdóttir
- (Iceland) Berglind Gunnarsdóttir
- (Iceland) Bryndís Guðmundsdóttir
- (Iceland) Eva Margrét Kristjánsdóttir
- (Iceland) Guðrún Gróa Þorsteinsdóttir
- (United States) Haiden Denise Palmer
- (Iceland) Hildur Björg Kjartansdóttir
- (Iceland) Hildur Sigurðardóttir
- (United States) Kristen McCarthy
- (Iceland) Pálína Gunnlaugsdóttir
- (Finland) Veera Pirttinen

== Coaches ==
- (United States) Justin Shouse (2007–2008)
- (Iceland) Högni Högnason (2008–2009)
- (Iceland) Ingi Þór Steinþórsson (2009–2018)
- (Iceland) Baldur Þorleifsson (2018–2019)
- (Iceland) Gunnlaugur Smárason (2019–2020)
- (Iceland) Halldór Steingrímsson (2020–2021)
- (Iceland) Baldur Þorleifsson (2021–2024)
- (Spain) Alejandro Rubiera (2024–present)
