= Raquel Laneiro =

Portuguese basketball player (born 2000)

Personal information
- Born: 10 November 2000 (age 26)
- Listed height: 171 cm (5 ft 7 in)
- Position: Point guard

Career history
- 2019–2022: Clube União Sportiva
- 2022–2023: Njarðvík
- 2023–2024: Fjölnir
- 2024–2025: CB Arxil Pontevedra

Career highlights
- Icelandic Super Cup (2022); Úrvalsdeild kvenna scoring leader (2024); Úrvalsdeild kvenna assist leader (2024)

Raquel Laneiro (born 10 November 2000) is a Portuguese basketball player and a member of the Portugal national team. She was the top scorer and assist leader in the Icelandic top-tier Úrvalsdeild kvenna during the 2023–2024 season.

== Professional career ==
Laneiro started her career with Clube União Sportiva in Portugal.

In July 2022, she signed with reigning Icelandic champions Njarðvík. On 18 September, she scored a game high 29 points in a 94–87 win against Haukar in the Icelandic Super Cup. On 13 March 2023, Laneiro made a game winning three pointer at the buzzer to beat rivals Keflavík 75–74.

In July 2023, Laneiro signed with Fjölnir. On 3 October 2023, she scored a career high 36 points in a win against Þór Akureyri. For the season, she averaged a league leading 24.2 points and 7.7 assist per game.
