= Hildur Sigurðardóttir =

Icelandic basketball player and coach

Personal information
- Born: 15 October 1981 (age 45) Stykkishólmur, Iceland
- Listed height: 178 cm (5 ft 10 in)

Career information
- Playing career: 1998–2018; 2022–2022
- Position: Point guard
- Number: 9, 10
- Coaching career: 2016–2018

Career history

Playing
- 1998–1999: ÍR
- 1999–2004: KR
- 2004–2005: Jämtland Basket
- 2005–2007: Grindavík
- 2007–2011: KR
- 2011–2015: Snæfell
- 2018: Breiðablik
- 2022: Snæfell

Coaching
- 2016–2018: Breiðablik
- 2017–2018: Iceland (assistant)

Career highlights
- As player: 4x Úrvalsdeild Domestic Player of the Year (2003, 2004, 2014, 2015); 13x Úrvalsdeild Domestic All-First Team (2001-2004, 2006-2010, 2012-2015); Úrvalsdeild Playoffs MVP (2014); 5x Icelandic champion (2001, 2002, 2010, 2014, 2015); 3× Icelandic Basketball Cup (2001, 2002, 2009); 4x Úrvalsdeild assists leader (2008, 2010, 2014, 2015); 7× Icelandic All-Star (2004, 2006–2008, 2010, 2013, 2014); Úrvalsdeild all-time career assists leader

Career Úrvalsdeild kvenna playing statistics
- Points: 4,576 (13.2 ppg)
- Rebounds: 2,882 (8.3 rpg)
- Assists: 1,662 (4.8 apg)

Career coaching record
- Úrvalsdeild kvenna: 11–17 (.393)
Medals
Women's basketball
Representing Iceland
Games of the Small States of Europe
Bronze medal – third place	2003 Malta	Team
Silver medal – second place	2005 Andorra	Team
Silver medal – second place	2009 Cyprus	Team
Silver medal – second place	2013 Luxemburg	Team
FIBA European Championship for Small Countries
Silver medal – second place	2002 Andorra	Team
Gold medal – first place	2004 Andorra	Team
Silver medal – second place	2014 Austria	Team

Hildur Sigurðardóttir (born 15 October 1981) is an Icelandic basketball coach and player. She is the former head coach of Úrvalsdeild kvenna club Breiðablik and an assistant coach to the Icelandic women's national basketball team. As a player she won the Icelandic championship five times and the Icelandic Basketball Cup three times. She was named the Úrvalsdeild Domestic Player of the Year four times and is the leagues all-time leader in assists She was the third player to reach 4000 points in the Úrvalsdeild kvenna. and remains second all-time in total rebounds in the league.

== Playing career ==
=== Club career ===
After coming up through the junior ranks of Snæfell, Hildur started her senior career with ÍR in the Úrvalsdeild kvenna.

After the 2003–2004 season, Hildur was named the Domestic Player of the Year, the Defensive Player of the Year and to the Domestic All-First Team.

She played with Jämtland Basket during the 2004-2005 Damligan season.

After one season in Sweden, Hildur returned to the Úrvalsdeild and signed with Grindavík.

In 2011, Hildur rejoined her hometown team of Snæfell and helped propel them to the top of the league. She was named the Úrvalsdeild's best domestic player in both 2014 and 2015.

Hildur retired after the 2014–2015 season and a year later, in June 2016, she was hired as the head coach of Breiðablik. Due to rash of injuries on her Breiðablik squad, Hildur donned a uniform on 21 March 2018, against Njarðvík. In six minutes, she had two points and 4 assists in a 59–77 loss.

In 2022, Hildur returned to Snæfell, now in the second-tier 1. deild kvenna, in a limited role due to injuries on the squad. She appeared in two league games and one cup game.

== National team career ==
Hildur is the most capped player in Icelandic women's national basketball team history, playing 79 games between 1999 and 2014.

== Coaching career ==
Hildur was hired as the head coach of Breiðablik's women's team in June 2016. In her first season, she led the team to promotion to Úrvalsdeild kvenna.

In October 2017, Hildur was hired as an assistant coach to the Icelandic women's national basketball team.

In April 2018, Hildur resigned as the head coach of Breiðablik.

== Personal life ==
Hildur is married to Bjarni Már Magnússon, a professor of law at Reykjavík University and former basketball player.

== Awards, titles and accomplishments ==
=== Individual awards ===
- Úrvalsdeild Domestic Player of the Year (4): 2003, 2004, 2014, 2015
- Úrvalsdeild Domestic All-First Team (13): 2001–2004, 2006–2010, 2012–2015
- Úrvalsdeild Playoffs MVP: 2014
- Úrvalsdeild Defensive Player of the Year : 2004
- Úrvalsdeild Young Player of the Year : 1999

=== Titles ===
- Icelandic champion (5): 2001, 2002, 2010, 2014, 2015
- Icelandic Basketball Cup (3): 2001, 2002, 2009
- Icelandic Supercup (4): 1999, 2009, 2010, 2014
- Icelandic Company Cup (3): 2000, 2009, 2012

=== Accomplishments ===
- Úrvalsdeild assists leader (4): 2008, 2010, 2014, 2015
- Úrvalsdeild all-time career assists leader
