= Emelía Ósk Gunnarsdóttir =

Icelandic basketball player (born 1998)

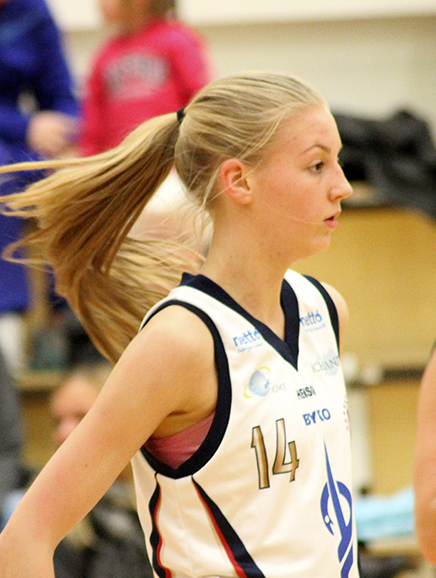
- Emelía Ósk in December 2014

Keflavík
- Position: Forward
- League: Úrvalsdeild kvenna

Personal information
- Born: 26 May 1998 (age 28)
- Listed height: 180 cm (5 ft 11 in)

Career information
- Playing career: 2014–present

Career history
- 2014–2021: Keflavík
- 2023–present: Keflavík

Career highlights
- Úrvalsdeild Domestic All-First Team (2017); Icelandic champion (2017); 3× Icelandic Basketball Cup (2017, 2018, 2024); Icelandic Supercup (2017); Icelandic Company Cup (2014)
Medals
Women's basketball
Representing Iceland
Games of the Small States of Europe
| Silver medal – second place | 2017 San Marino | Team |

Emelía Ósk Gunnarsdóttir (born 26 May 1998) is an Icelandic basketball player for Úrvalsdeild kvenna club Keflavík. She won the Icelandic championship in 2017 with Keflavík. The previous year, she debuted for the Icelandic national basketball team.

== Playing career ==
Emelía played her first senior team games for Keflavík during the later part of the 2013–2014 season. During the 2015–2016 season she averaged 6.5 points per game. She had her breakout season in 2016–2017, becoming one of the league's top defensive players.

In December 2017, Emelía tore her ACL in a game against Skallagrímur and missed the rest of the season. At the time of her injury, she was averaging 10.1 points and 3.2 rebounds per game. She returned in March 2019, appearing in four regular season and eight playoff games.

In July 2021, she left the team to pursue an education in Sweden. In January 2023, Emelía rejoined Keflavík.

== National team career ==
Emelía played her first games for the Icelandic national basketball team in 2016.
