= Helena Sverrisdóttir =

Icelandic basketball player

Personal information
- Born: 11 March 1988 (age 38) Reykjavík, Iceland
- Listed height: 184 cm (6 ft 0 in)

Career information
- College: TCU (2007–2011)
- Playing career: 2000–2023
- Position: Forward

Career history

Playing
- 2000–2007: Haukar
- 2011–2013: Good Angels Kosice
- 2013–2014: Diósgyőri VTK
- 2014–2015: CCC Polkowise
- 2015–2018: Haukar
- 2017–2018: → Good Angels Kosice
- 2018: Ceglédi EKK
- 2018–2021: Valur
- 2021–2023: Haukar

Coaching
- 2015–2016: Haukar
- 2020–2021: Valur (assistant)

Career highlights
- As player: 12× Icelandic Basketball Player of the Year (2005–2015, 2019); 7× Úrvalsdeild Domestic Player of the Year (2005–2007, 2016, 2018, 2019, 2021); 2× Úrvalsdeild Playoffs MVP (2007, 2018, 2019, 2021); 6× Úrvalsdeild Domestic All-First Team (2005–2007, 2016, 2018, 2019); 4× Icelandic Cup Finals MVP (2019, 2021–2023); 5× Icelandic champion (2006, 2007, 2018, 2019, 2021); 5× Icelandic Cup (2005, 2007, 2019, 2021, 2022); 4× Icelandic Super Cup (2006, 2019, 2021, 2023); 2× Slovak champion (2012, 2013); 3× Slovak Cup (2012, 2013, 2018); Úrvalsdeild scoring champion (2005); 4× Úrvalsdeild assist leader (2005–2007, 2016); MWC Player of the Year (2010); 3× MWC All-Tournament Team (2009–2011); As coach: Icelandic Company Cup (2015)
Medals
Women's basketball
Representing Iceland
Games of the Small States of Europe
Silver medal – second place	2005 Andorra	Team
Silver medal – second place	2009 Cyprus	Team
Silver medal – second place	2013 Luxembourg	Team
Silver medal – second place	2015 Reykjavík	Team
Silver medal – second place	2017 San Marino	Team
Silver medal – second place	2019 Bar	Team

Helena Sverrisdóttir (born 11 March 1988) is an Icelandic former basketball player. Generally considered the greatest Icelandic female basketball player of all time, she was named the Icelandic Women's Basketball Player of the Year 12 times. During her playing career, she won the Icelandic championship five times and the Slovak championship two times.

Helena played college basketball for TCU where she was named the Mountain West Conference Player of the Year in 2010.

She played for the Iceland women's national basketball team for 21 years, becoming its all-time leader in games played in 2023.

== Early life ==
Helena was born in Reykjavík, Iceland, but grew up in Hafnarfjörður. She played both basketball and football in her youth.

== Playing career ==
Helena first played for Haukar's senior team in 2000, at the age of 12. After winning Division I in 2002 with Haukar, Helena took the Úrvalsdeild by storm in 2002–2003, averaging 17.1 points, 9.5 rebounds and 4.3 assists. She was named the Úrvalsdeild Young Player of the Year and was widely regarded as the top prospect in the country. Despite her performance, Haukar finished last in the league and were relegated back to Division I.

In 2003–2004, at the age of 16, Helena averaged a quadruple-double in the Icelandic Division I with 37.6 points, 13.3 rebounds, 11.6 assists and 10.2 steals. Out of the 16 games she played, she posted a quadruple-double in six of them. Her best scoring output came against Ármann/Þróttur where she scored 86 points.

She played college basketball for TCU from 2007 to 2011. In October 2024, she was inducted into the schools athletics Hall of Fame.

Helena returned to Haukar in 2016 after 9 seasons away and helped the club achieve the best regular season record in the Úrvalsdeild kvenna. For the season she averaged 24.4 points, 13.3 rebounds and 6.8 assists, and was named the Úrvalsdeild Domestic Player of the Year. Helena missed most of the 2016–2017 season due to being pregnant of her first child. She returned to the floor on March 19 in a loss against Stjarnan, five weeks after the birth of her daughter.

On December 20, 2017, Haukar loaned Helena to Good Angels Kosice until the end of January 2018. On January 21, Helena helped the Good Angels win the Slovak Basketball Cup.

On April 30, 2018, she helped Haukar to win the national championship, their fourth championship and first one in nine years. Helena was named the Úrvalsdeild Playoffs MVP after averaging 20.2 points, 12.2 rebounds and 10.8 assists in the finals series. On May 4, Helena was named the Úrvalsdeild Domestic Player of the Year and to the Úrvalsdeild Domestic All-First Team.

On 16 May 2018, Helena signed with Ceglédi EKK of the Hungarian Nemzeti Bajnokság I/A. In November she left the club after a contract dispute.

On 15 November 2018, Helena signed with Úrvalsdeild kvenna club Valur. On 16 February 2019, she won the Icelandic Cup after Valur defeated Stjarnan in the Cup finals, 74–90. In the game, Helena had 31 points, 13 rebounds and 6 assists. On 27 April 2019, she helped Valur win its first ever national championship after beating Keflavík in the Úrvalsdeild finals 3–0. After the season she was named the Úrvalsdeild Domestic Player of the Year for the second straight year and to the Úrvalsdeild Domestic All-First Team.

Valur opened the 2019–20 season by defeating Keflavík, 105–81, in the annual Icelandic Super Cup where Helena posted 14 points, 13 rebounds and 7 assists. It was Valur's first Super Cup win and the victory made them the holders of all four major national crowns, the others being the national championship, the national cup and the league championship which is awarded for the best regular season record in the Úrvalsdeild.

In December 2019, she was named the Icelandic Women's Basketball Player of the Year for the 12th time in her career.

On 29 May 2020, Helena announced that she was pregnant with her second child.

On 2 June 2021, she won the national championship after Valur beat Haukar 3–0 in the Úrvalsdeild finals and was named the Playoffs MVP. After the season, she was named to the Úrvalsdeild Domestic All-First Team.

On 19 June 2021, Helena signed back with her hometown team of Haukar. On 18 September 2021, she led Haukar to victory in the Icelandic Cup and was named the Cup Finals MVP after turning in 26 points, 9 rebounds and 9 assists in the 94–89 win against Fjölnir in the Cup finals. On 30 September, she scored 32 points in the second leg of the 2021–22 EuroCup Women Qualifiers matches against Clube União Sportiva, leading Haukar to an aggregate win of 160-157 and a seat in the EuroCup regular season. On 19 March 2022, she won the Icelandic Cup again after Haukar defeated Breiðablik in the 2022 Cup Finals.

On 20 September 2023, still battling with injuries, Helena was an unused substitute in Haukar's 78–77 win against Valur in the Icelandic Super Cup. On 19 November 2023, she announced her retirement from playing due to a knee injury.

=== TCU statistics ===
Ratios
Year	Team	GP	FG%	3P%	FT%	RBG	APG	BPG	SPG	PPG
2007-08	TCU	35	43.0%	30.7%	68.1%	5.71	2.49	0.40	1.23	9.34
2008-09	TCU	31	43.8%	37.6%	81.2%	7.39	4.81	0.42	1.71	15.84
2009-10	TCU	31	42.3%	33.0%	79.1%	6.68	5.19	0.61	2.19	13.65
2010-11	TCU	33	44.5%	37.6%	79.9%	5.76	4.52	0.55	1.91	15.70
Career		130	43.5%	35.0%	78.3%	6.35	4.20	0.49	1.75	13.53

Totals
Year	Team	GP	FG	FGA	3P	3PA	FT	FTA	REB	A	BK	ST	PTS
2007-08	TCU	35	117	272	31	101	62	91	200	87	14	43	327
2008-09	TCU	31	153	349	38	101	147	181	229	149	13	53	491
2009-10	TCU	31	134	317	38	115	117	148	207	161	19	68	423
2010-11	TCU	33	158	355	59	157	143	179	190	149	18	63	518
Career		130	562	1293	166	474	469	599	826	546	64	227	1759

== Icelandic national team ==
Helena is the Icelandic women's national basketball team's allt team leader in games played, playing 81 games from 2002 to 2023.

== Personal life ==
Helena's sister, Guðbjörg Sverrisdóttir, plays for Valur in Úrvalsdeild kvenna and was named to the 2016 Úrvalsdeild Domestic All-First Team. She has also played for the Icelandic national team since 2014. Her brother, Kristján Leifur Sverrisson, played for Haukar in Úrvalsdeild karla.

Helena is married to former Icelandic national team player Finnur Atli Magnússon with whom she has one daughter.

== Awards, titles and accomplishments ==
=== Individual awards ===
- Icelandic Women's Basketball Player of the Year (12): 2005–2015, 2019
- Úrvalsdeild Domestic Player of the Year (6): 2005, 2006, 2007, 2016, 2018, 2019
- Úrvalsdeild Domestic All-First Team (7): 2005–2007, 2016, 2018, 2019, 2021
- Úrvalsdeild Playoffs MVP (4): 2007, 2018, 2019, 2021
- Úrvalsdeild Young Player of the Year : 2003
- Icelandic Cup Finals MVP (3): 2019, 2021, 2022
- Mountain West Conference Player of the Year: 2010
- Mountain West Conference All-Tournament Team (3): 2009, 2010, 2011
- Mountain West Conference Freshman of the Year: 2008

=== Titles ===
==== Iceland ====
- Icelandic champion (5): 2006, 2007, 2018, 2019, 2021
- Icelandic Basketball Cup (5): 2005, 2007, 2019, 2021, 2022, 2023
- Icelandic Super Cup (3): 2006, 2019, 2021
- Icelandic Company Cup (3): 2005, 2006, 2015
- Icelandic Division I (2): 2002, 2004

==== Slovenia ====
- Slovak champion (2): 2012, 2013
- Slovak Basketball Cup (3): 2012, 2013, 2018

=== Accomplishments ===
- Úrvalsdeild scoring champion: 2005
- Úrvalsdeild assist leader (4): 2005, 2006, 2007, 2016
