= Haiden Palmer =

American basketball player

Personal information
- Born: March 28, 1991 (age 35) Moreno Valley, California, U.S.
- Listed height: 173 cm (5 ft 8 in)

Career information
- High school: Vista del Lago (Moreno Valley, California)
- College: Oregon State (2009–2010); Gonzaga (2011–2014)
- WNBA draft: 2014: 3rd round, 29th overall pick
- Drafted by: Indiana Fever
- Playing career: 2014–2026
- Position: Head coach
- Number: 3, 5
- Coaching career: 2022–present

Career history

Playing
- 2014: Indias de Mayagüez
- 2014–2015: Elizur Natanya
- 2015–2016: Snæfell
- 2016–2017: Herner TC
- 2017–2018: TSV 1880 Wasserburg
- 2018–2019: TK Hannover
- 2019–2020: Tapiolan Honka
- 2020–2021: Snæfell
- 2021–2022: Haukar
- 2026: Snæfell

Coaching
- 2023–2024: Gonzaga (assistant)
- 2025–2026: Snæfell

Career highlights
- As player: Úrvalsdeild Foreign Player of the Year (2016); Úrvalsdeild Playoffs MVP (2016); Icelandic Cup MVP (2016); Icelandic league champion (2016); 2× Icelandic Basketball Cup (2016, 2021); German Basketball Cup (2018); 2× Icelandic Super Cup (2015, 2021); Úrvalsdeild kvenna assist leader (2021); WCC Tournament MVP (2013); 2x All-WCC (2013, 2014); WCC Rookie of the Year (2012); Pac-12 All-Freshman Team (2010)
- Stats at Basketball Reference

Haiden Denise Palmer (born March 28, 1991, in Moreno Valley, California) is an American basketball coach and former player. She played college basketball for Oregon State and Gonzaga before going on to play professionally. She won the Icelandic championship and Icelandic Cup with Snæfell in 2016 while being named the Foreign Player of the Year, Playoffs MVP and the Cup MVP. She later went on to play in Germany where she won the German Cup in 2018 with TSV 1880 Wasserburg. In 2021, she win the Icelandic Cup again, this time with Haukar.

== College career ==
Palmer started her college basketball with Oregon State in 2009 and averaged 10.8 points for the 2009–10 season. She left Oregon after the season, along with several of her teammates due to their dissatisfaction with coach LaVonda Wagner, and joined Gonzaga where she redshirted her first year. She was named the 2011–12 WCC Newcomer of the Year and the 2013 WCC Most Outstanding Player at the WCC Women's Basketball Championship. She helped Gonzaga to three WCC regular-season titles, two WCC Tournament Championships and three NCAA Tournaments, reaching the Sweet 16 in 2012. After her senior season in 2014, she was recognized as an honorable mention All-American by the Associated Press.

== Professional career ==
Palmer was drafted by the Indiana Fever in the 2014 WNBA draft but was waived on May 12. Her first professional stop was with Indias de Mayagüez of the Baloncesto Superior Nacional Femenino in 2014. She spent the 2014–2015 season with Elizur Natanya in Israel where she averaged 15.1 points and 7.2 rebounds in 19 games.

In 2015 she signed with Snæfell of the Icelandic Úrvalsdeild kvenna. Snæfell started the season by winning the Icelandic Super Cup on 11 October 2015, beating Grindavík 79–45, where Palmer had 22 points and 8 assists. In February 2016, she helped Snæfell to the Icelandic Basketball Cup finals. In the Cup finals, Haiden had a triple-double with 23 points, 13 rebounds and 10 assists in Snæfell's 78–70 victory over Grindavík and was named the Cup Finals MVP.

Palmer led Snæfell to a 3–2 victory over Haukar in the Úrvalsdeild finals. She was named the Finals MVP after she broke Olga Færseth's 22-year old scoring record by scoring 134 points in the five games. After the season she was named the Úrvalsdeild Foreign Player of the Year.

Palmer signed with Herner TC of the Damen-Basketball-Bundesliga for the 2016–2017 season where she averaged 13.2 points, 4.8 rebounds, 3.4 assists and 2.9 steals in 22 games.

She moved to TSV 1880 Wasserburg in 2017 and helped the club to both the DBBL and cup finals. She also played for the club in the EuroCup Women, averaging 11.8 points, 5.6 rebounds and 2.6 steals per game.

In July 2018, Palmer signed with TK Hannover of the DBBL.

She spent the 2019–20 season with Tapiolan Honka in the Naisten Korisliiga where she averaged 19.6 points, 5.7 rebounds and 5.6 assists per game.

On 25 June 2020, Palmer returned to the Úrvalsdeild kvenna, signing back with Snæfell. In her first game, she had 24 points and a season high 11 steals. On 24 March 2021, she scored a season high 39 points in a victory against KR. On two occasions she reached a season high 22 rebounds, in a loss against Fjölnir and a victory against Breiðablik in the last game of the season, where she also had 27 points and 11 assists, her fourth triple-double of the season. In 19 games, she averaged a league leading 7.9 assist per game along with 21.7 points and 11.9 rebounds.

On 6 July 2021, Palmer signed with Haukar. On 18 August 2021, she helped Haukar to a 94–89 victory against Fjölnir in the Icelandic Cup final with 23 points, 8 rebounds and 10 assists. On September 23, she scored 24 points in a victory against Portuguese club Clube União Sportiva in the EuroCup. On 3 October, Haiden had 10 points, 7 rebounds and 5 assists in a win against Valur in the Icelandic Super Cup. She left the team in December 2021 after averaging 9.6 points, 9.7 rebounds and 7.6 assists in 7 Úrvalsdeild games. In March, Palmer returned to Haukar, following Keira Robinson's injury. On 10 April, she had 24 points, 10 rebounds and 6 assists in game three of Haukar's semi-finals sweep against Valur.

While serving as the head coach of Snæfell for the 2025–26 season, she suited up for the last four games of the season, averaging 15.8 points, 9.3 rebounds and 9.2 assists.

== Coaching career ==
In August 2022, it was announced that Palmer was named video coordinator for the Gonzaga Bulldogs women's basketball team. The following season she was promoted to an assistant coach.

In April 2025, she was hired as the head coach of Snæfell women's team.

== Statistics ==
=== College statistics ===
Legend
GP	Games played	GS	Games started	MPG	Minutes per game
FG%	Field goal percentage	3P%	3-point field goal percentage	FT%	Free throw percentage
RPG	Rebounds per game	APG	Assists per game	SPG	Steals per game
BPG	Blocks per game	PPG	Points per game	**Bold**	Career high

Year	Team	GP	Points	FG%	3P%	FT%	RPG	APG	SPG	BPG	PPG
2009–10	Oregon State	31	335	37.6%	17.0%	**63.8%**	3.5	1.2	1.4	0.2	10.8
2010–11	Gonzaga	Sat out due to NCAA transfer rules									
2011–12	Gonzaga	**34**	423	40.4%	**34.7%**	61.7%	4.5	2.0	2.3	**0.4**	12.4
2012–13	Gonzaga	33	411	39.5%	24.5%	59.2%	3.8	2.4	**3.2**	0.1	12.5
2013–14	Gonzaga	**34**	**513**	**42.4%**	30.4%	58.8%	**5.5**	**2.6**	3.0	0.4	**15.1**
Career		132	1682	40.2%	11.1%	61.0%	10.7	2.1	2.5	0.3	12.7

== Awards and accomplishments ==
=== Club Honours ===
==== Germany ====
- German Basketball Cup (2018)

==== Iceland ====
- Icelandic league champion (2016)
- Icelandic Basketball Cup (2016, 2021)
- Icelandic Super Cup (2015)

=== Individual honours ===
==== Iceland ====
- Úrvalsdeild Foreign Player of the Year (2016)
- Úrvalsdeild Playoffs MVP (2016)
- Icelandic Cup MVP (2016)
