= 2014–15 Úrvalsdeild kvenna (basketball) =

Domino's deild kvenna^{1}
- Duration: October 8, 2014 – April 27, 2015
- Teams: 8
- TV partner(s): Stöð 2 Sport

Regular season
- Top seed: Snæfell
- Relegated: Breiðablik

Finals
- Champions: Snæfell (2nd title)
- Runners-up: Keflavík
- Semifinalists: Haukar, Grindavík
- Finals MVP: (United States) Kristen McCarthy

Awards
- Domestic MVP: (Iceland) Hildur Sigurðardóttir
- Foreign MVP: (United States) Kristen McCarthy

Statistical leaders
Points	(United States) Lele Hardy	28.4
Rebounds	(United States) Lele Hardy	20.3
Assists	(Iceland) Hildur Sigurðardóttir	6.1
- ^{1} Sponsored league name, referring to Úrvalsdeild kvenna.

The 2014–15 Úrvalsdeild kvenna was the 57th season of the Úrvalsdeild kvenna, the top tier women's basketball league on Iceland. The season started on October 8, 2014 and ended on April 27, 2015. Snæfell won its second straight title by defeating Keflavík 3–0 in the Finals.

== Competition format ==
The participating teams first played a conventional round-robin schedule with every team playing each opponent twice "home" and twice "away" for a total of 28 games. The top four teams qualified for the championship playoffs whilst the bottom team was relegated to Division 1.

== Regular season ==
Pos	Team	Pld	W	L	PF	PA	PD	Pts	Qualification or relegation
1	Snæfell	28	25	3	2196	1728	+468	50	Qualification to playoffs
2	Keflavík	28	22	6	2350	1827	+523	44	Qualification to playoffs
3	Haukar	28	18	10	1981	1832	+149	36	Qualification to playoffs
4	Grindavík	28	17	11	2005	1992	+13	34	Qualification to playoffs
5	Valur	28	15	13	2070	1990	+80	30	
6	Hamar	28	6	22	1558	2120	−562	12	
7	KR	28	5	23	1702	1979	−277	10	Asked for relegation to Division I
8	Breiðablik	28	4	24	1737	2131	−394	8	Relegated to Division I

Source: Úrvalsdeild kvenna 2014–15

== Playoffs ==
Semifinals
1	Snæfell	3
4	Grindavík	1
2	Keflavík	3
3	Haukar	0

Finals
1	Snæfell	3
2	Keflavík	0
