= 2015–16 Úrvalsdeild kvenna (basketball) =

Domino's deild kvenna^{1}
- Duration: October 14, 2015 – April 26, 2016
- Teams: 7

Regular season
- Top seed: Haukar
- Relegated: None

Finals
- Champions: Snæfell (3rd title)
- Runners-up: Haukar
- Semifinalists: Grindavík, Valur
- Finals MVP: (United States) Haiden Denise Palmer

Awards
- Domestic MVP: (Iceland) Helena Sverrisdóttir
- Foreign MVP: (United States) Haiden Denise Palmer

Statistical leaders
Points	(United States) Chelsie Schweers	27.1
Rebounds	(United States) Karisma Chapman	15.4
Assists	(Iceland) Helena Sverrisdóttir	7.5
- ^{1} Sponsored league name, referring to Úrvalsdeild kvenna.

The 2015–16 Úrvalsdeild kvenna was the 58th season of the Úrvalsdeild kvenna, the top tier women's basketball league on Iceland. The season started on October 14, 2015, and ended on April 24, 2016. Snæfell won its third straight title by defeating Haukar 3–2 in the Finals.

== Competition format ==
The participating teams first played a conventional round-robin schedule with every team playing each opponent twice "home" and twice "away" for a total of 24 games. The top four teams qualified for the championship playoffs while none were relegated to Division 1 due to vacant berths.

== Regular season ==
Pos	Team	Pld	W	L	PF	PA	PD	Pts	Qualification or relegation
1	Haukar	24	22	2	1911	1564	+347	44	Qualification to playoffs
2	Snæfell	24	21	3	1831	1415	+416	42	Qualification to playoffs
3	Valur	24	13	11	1756	1691	+65	26	Qualification to playoffs
4	Grindavík	24	12	12	1732	1695	+37	24	Qualification to playoffs
5	Keflavík	24	10	14	1680	1705	−25	20	
6	Stjarnan	24	3	21	1598	1866	−268	6	
7	Hamar	24	3	21	1415	1987	−572	6	Disbanded after the season

Source: Úrvalsdeild kvenna 2015–16

== Playoffs ==
Semifinals
1	Haukar	3
4	Grindavík	2
2	Snæfell	3
3	Valur	0

Finals
1	Haukar	2
2	Snæfell	3

== Notable occurrences ==
- In October 2015, Haukar added former Washington University in St. Louis point guard Shanna-Lei Dacanay.
