= Stjarnan (women's basketball) =

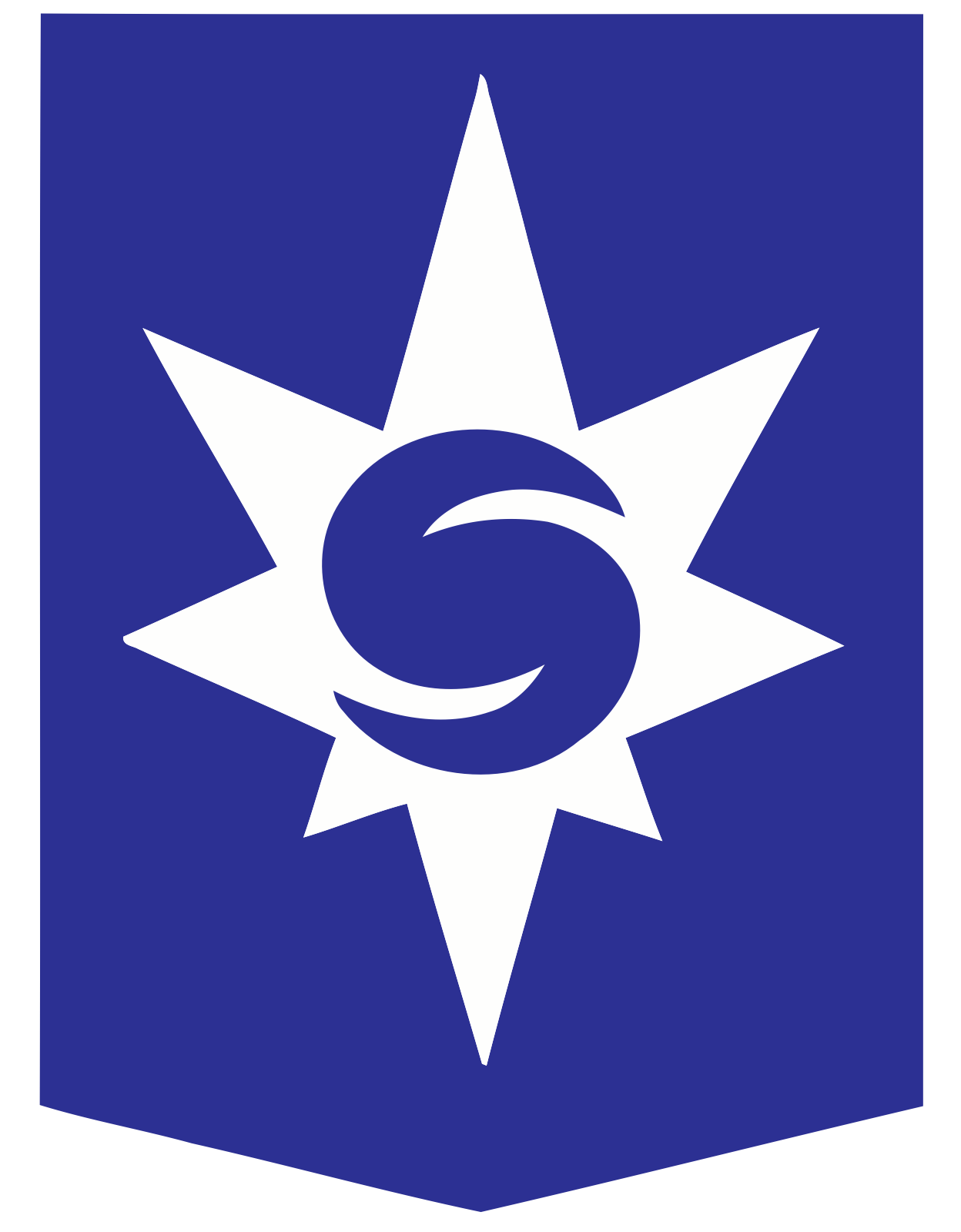
- Leagues: Úrvalsdeild kvenna
- Founded: Stjarnan; 2009–present
- Arena: Ásgarður
- Location: Garðabær, Iceland
- Team colors: Blue, White
- Head coach: Ólafur Jónas Sigurðsson
- Website: Stjarnan.is
Home	Away

The Stjarnan women's basketball team, commonly known as Stjarnan, is the women's basketball department of Ungmennafélagið Stjarnan, based in the town of Garðabær, Iceland.

== History ==
In 2009, disgruntled Ármann players, unhappy with poor training facilities and lack of practice time, contacted Stjarnan and inquired if the board would be interested in starting a women's team. The board responded positively and in the end the entire Ármann team transferred over.

Stjarnan finished first in the second-tier 1. deild kvenna in 2015 and defeated Njarðvík in the playoffs to win promotion to the top-tier Úrvalsdeild kvenna for the first time in its history.

After a disappointing first season, where high scoring guard Chelsie Schweers was fired mid-season and head coach Baldur Ingi Jónasson resigned before the seasons end, Stjarnan bounced back in 2016–2017 behind Danielle Rodriguez stellar play and made it to the playoffs. They were beaten 3–0 by Snæfell in the semi-finals.

On 13 February 2019, behind Rodriguez 33 points, including a three-point heave from just inside the half-court line to finish the first half, Stjarnan's won Breiðablik, 103–82, in the Icelandic Cup semi-finals, advancing to the Cup finals for the first time in its history.

On June 7, 2019, the board of Stjarnan withdrew the team from the Úrvalsdeild for the upcoming season and registered for the second-tier 1. deild kvenna, stating that it was necessary after several of its starters had left the team. On 22 August it was reported that the board had withdrawn the team from the 1. deild kvenna after it delayed hiring a new head coach. A spokesperson for the board stated that it did not want to field a team that relied to much on non-homegrown players. The club was criticized for its actions in withdrawing the team, including by former player Ragna Margrét Brynjarsdóttir, especially since the argument of homegrown players did not apply to its men's team where the vast majority of players did not come up through Stjarnan's youth program.

== Season by season ==
Season	Tier	League	Pos.	W–L	Playoffs	Icelandic Cup
2009–10	2	1. deild kvenna	4th	7–8	DNQ	1st Round
2010–11	2	1. deild kvenna	1st	12–2	Runner-up	1st Round
2011–12	2	1. deild kvenna	3rd	11–4	DNQ	2nd Round
2012–13	2	1. deild kvenna	2nd	12–4	Runner-up	2nd Round
2013–14	2	1. deild kvenna	4th	8–6	DNQ	1st Round
2014–15	2	1. deild kvenna	2nd	8–4	Promotion	1st Round
2015–16	1	Úrvalsdeild kvenna	6th	3–21	DNQ	SF
2016–17	1	Úrvalsdeild kvenna	4th	14–14	SF	QF
2017–18	1	Úrvalsdeild kvenna	5th	14–14	DNQ	1st Round
2018–19	1	Úrvalsdeild kvenna	3rd	18–10	SF	Runner-up
2019–20	Did not participate					
2020–21	2	1. deild kvenna	7th	6–10	1st Round	QF
2021–22	2	1. deild kvenna	9th	7–13	DNQ	QF
2022–23	2	1. deild kvenna	1st	21–3	N/A^{1}	SF
2022–23	1	Úrvalsdeild kvenna	TBD	0–0	TBD	TBD

Notes
^{1} Promoted to Úrvalsdeild kvenna.

== Trophies and awards ==
=== Trophies ===
- 1. deild kvenna (2):

2011, 2023

=== Awards ===
Úrvalsdeild Women's Domestic All-First Team

- Ragna Margrét Brynjarsdóttir – 2017

Úrvalsdeild Women's Foreign Player of the Year

- Danielle Rodriguez – 2018

Úrvalsdeild Women's Defensive Player of the Year

- Auður Íris Ólafsdóttir – 2019

== Notable players ==
Criteria

To appear in this section a player must have either:

- Played at least three seasons for the club.
- Set a club record or won an individual award while at the club.
- Played at least one official international match for their national team at any time.
- Played at least one official WNBA match at any time.

- (Iceland) Auður Íris Ólafsdóttir
- (Iceland) Bríet Sif Hinriksdóttir
- (Iceland) Danielle Rodriguez
- (Iceland) Diljá Ögn Lárusdóttir
- (Iceland) Ísold Sævarsdóttir
- (Iceland) Jana Falsdóttir
- (Iceland) Jóhanna Björk Sveinsdóttir
- (Iceland) Kolbrún María Ármannsdóttir
- (Iceland) Margrét Kara Sturludóttir
- (Iceland) Ragna Margrét Brynjarsdóttir
- (Iceland) Sóllilja Bjarnadóttir
- (Iceland) Sylvía Rún Hálfdánardóttir
- (Iceland) Unnur Tara Jónsdóttir

== Coaches ==
- (Kingdom of the Netherlands) Berry Timmermans 2009-2011
- (Iceland) Eggert Maríuson 2011-2012
- (Iceland) Kjartan Atli Kjartansson 2012-2013
- (Iceland) Bragi Hinrik Magnússon 2013-2014
- (Iceland) Sævaldur Bjarnason 2014-2015
- (Iceland) Baldur Ingi Jónasson 2015-2016
- (Kingdom of the Netherlands) Berry Timmermans 2016
- (Iceland) Pétur Már Sigurðsson 2016–2019
- (Iceland) Margrét Sturlaugsdóttir 2020–2021
- (Iceland) Pálína Gunnlaugsdóttir 2021
- (Iceland) Auður Íris Ólafsdóttir 2021–2023
- (Iceland) Arnar Guðjónsson 2023–2024
- (Iceland) Ólafur Jónas Sigurðsson 2024–present
