= 2016–17 Úrvalsdeild kvenna (basketball) =

Domino's deild kvenna^{1}
- Duration: October 5, 2016 – April 26, 2017
- Teams: 8
- TV partner(s): Stöð 2 Sport

Regular season
- Top seed: Snæfell
- Relegated: Grindavík

Finals
- Champions: Keflavík (16th title)
- Runners-up: Snæfell
- Semifinalists: Skallagrímur, Stjarnan
- Finals MVP: (United States) Ariana Moorer

Awards
- Domestic MVP: (Iceland) Thelma Dís Ágústsdóttir
- Foreign MVP: (United States) Ariana Moorer

Statistical leaders
| Points | (United States) Carm. Tyson-Thomas | 37.0 |
| Rebounds | (United States) Mia Loyd | 16.7 |
| Assists | (United States) Danielle Rodriguez | 5.9 |
- All statistics correct as of 27 April 2018.^{1} Sponsored league name, referring to Úrvalsdeild kvenna.

The 2016–17 Úrvalsdeild kvenna was the 60th season of the Úrvalsdeild kvenna, the top tier women's basketball league on Iceland. The season started on October 5, 2016 and ended on April 24, 2017. Keflavík won its sixteenth title by defeating defending champions Snæfell 3–1 in the Finals.

== Competition format ==
The participating teams first played a conventional round-robin schedule with every team playing each opponent twice "home" and twice "away" for a total of 28 games. The top four teams qualified for the championship playoffs whilst the bottom team was relegated to Division 1.

== Regular season ==
| Pos | Team | Pld | W | L | PF | PA | PD | Pts | Qualification or relegation |
|---|---|---|---|---|---|---|---|---|---|
| 1 | Snæfell | 28 | 22 | 6 | 2031 | 1752 | +279 | 44 | Qualification to playoffs |
| 2 | Keflavík | 28 | 22 | 6 | 2068 | 1721 | +347 | 44 | Qualification to playoffs |
| 3 | Skallagrímur | 28 | 19 | 9 | 2056 | 1878 | +178 | 38 | Qualification to playoffs |
| 4 | Stjarnan | 28 | 14 | 14 | 1870 | 1909 | −39 | 28 | Qualification to playoffs |
| 5 | Valur | 28 | 12 | 16 | 2061 | 2038 | +23 | 24 | |
| 6 | Njarðvík | 28 | 10 | 18 | 1884 | 2129 | −245 | 20 | |
| 7 | Haukar | 28 | 8 | 20 | 1720 | 1924 | −204 | 16 | |
| 8 | Grindavík | 28 | 5 | 23 | 1817 | 2156 | −339 | 10 | Relegated |

Source: Úrvalsdeild kvenna 2016-17

== Playoffs ==
Semifinals
1 | Snæfell | 3
4 | Stjarnan | 0
2 | Keflavík | 3
3 | Skallagrímur | 2

Finals
1 | Snæfell | 1
2 | Keflavík | 3
