= Stykkishólmur =

- Municipality
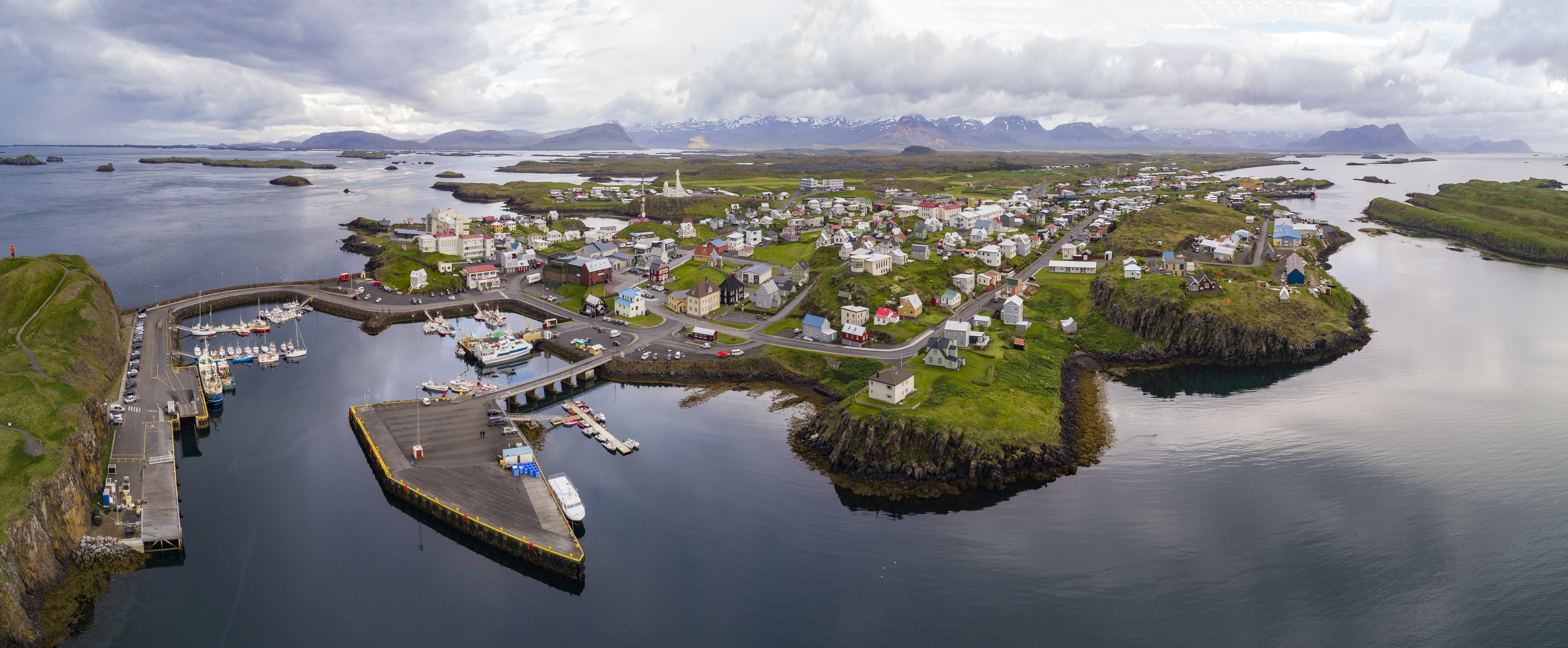
- Skyline of Stykkishólmsbær

- Location of Stykkishólmur
- Coordinates: 65°04′30″N 22°43′30″W
- Country: Iceland
- Region: Western Region
- Constituency: Northwest Constituency

Government
  - Mayor: Jakob Björgvin Jakobsson

Area
  - Total: 10 km^{2} (3.9 sq mi)

Population
  - Total: 1,200
  - Density: 109.5/km^{2} (284/sq mi)
- Postal code(s): 340, 345
- Municipal number: 3711
- Website: stykkisholmur.is

Norwegian house in Stykkishólmur

Stykkishólmur (Icelandic pronunciation: [ˈstɪhcɪsˌhoulmʏr̥]) is a town and municipality situated in the western part of Iceland, in the northern part of the Snæfellsnes peninsula. It is a center of services and commerce for the area. Most of the people make their living from fishing and tourism. A ferry called Baldur goes over the Breiðafjörður fjord to the Westfjords. It also is the gateway to Flatey. The origin of Stykkishólmur can be traced to its natural harbor. The location became an important trading post early in Iceland's history: the first trading post in Stykkishólmur is traced back to the mid-16th century, even before Denmark implemented the Danish–Icelandic Trade Monopoly (1602 – 1787). From that time trading has been at the heart of the settlement's history. In 1828 Árni Thorlacius built a large house for his home and companies, the Norwegian house, which has been renovated and accommodates the local museum.

== Overview ==
When the favorable position of Stykkishólmur was discovered in 1550, a trading post was founded at the site. Today, the most vital employment sectors in the town are fishing and tourism, especially during the summer. There are several sightworthy wooden buildings in the town centre. Egilsenshús is a wooden house dating from 1867 which belonged to a Danish merchant.

The town was named after a small island in front of the harbor called Stykkið ([ˈstɪhcɪθ], "the piece"). The nearby mountain of Helgafell is the burial place of Guðrún Ósvífursdóttir, a heroine of the Icelandic sagas.

The port of Stykkishólmur has a long history as a trading hub, dating back to the mid-16th century. The port was used by Icelanders emigrating to North America. 1887 saw a peak in emigration with over 70 people leaving the port. About 500 people eventually emigrated from Stykkishólmur port to North America between 1870-1914.

The town's former library has been restored as a public hall and contains an installation by the American artist Roni Horn.

The sports club of Stykkishólmur is called Snæfell, named after the glacier Snæfellsjökull located on Snæfellsnes. The town's most popular sport is basketball.

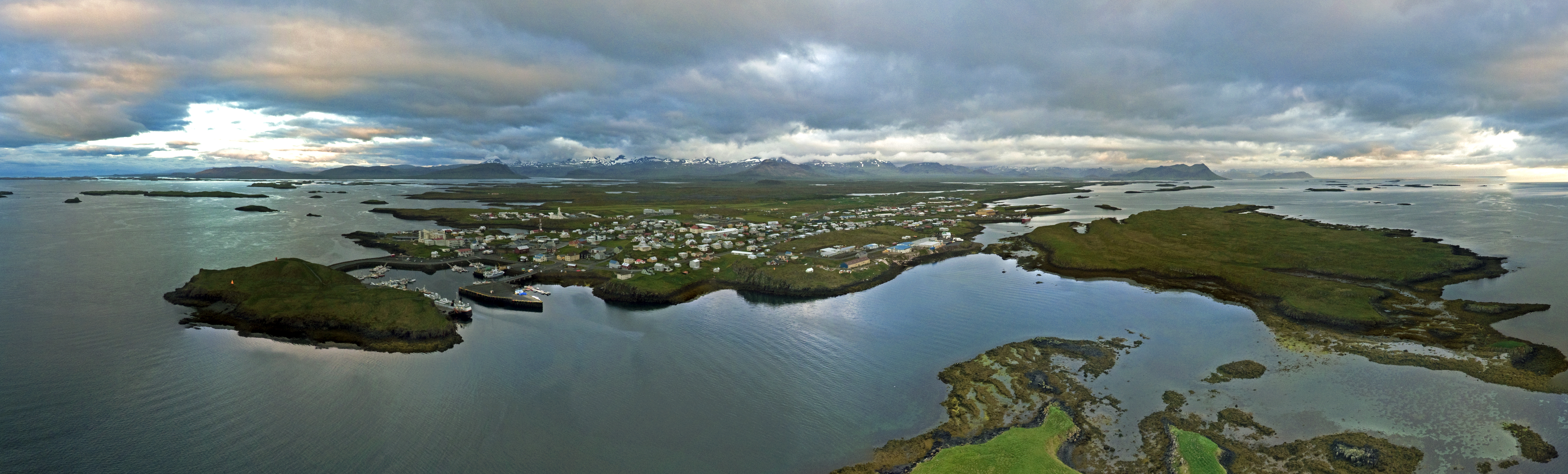
Aerial panorama of Stykkishólmur from the sea, June 2017

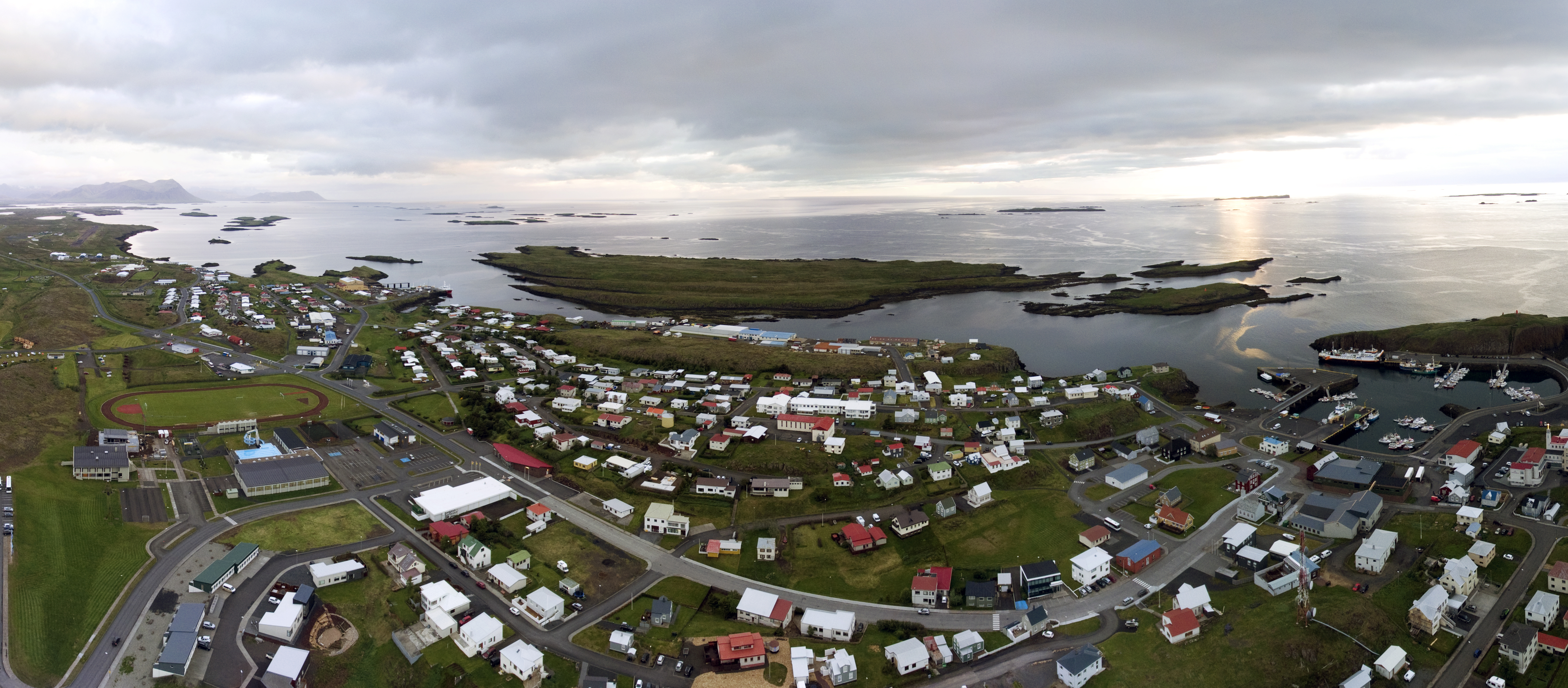
Stykkishólmur facing the midnight sun

== In popular culture ==
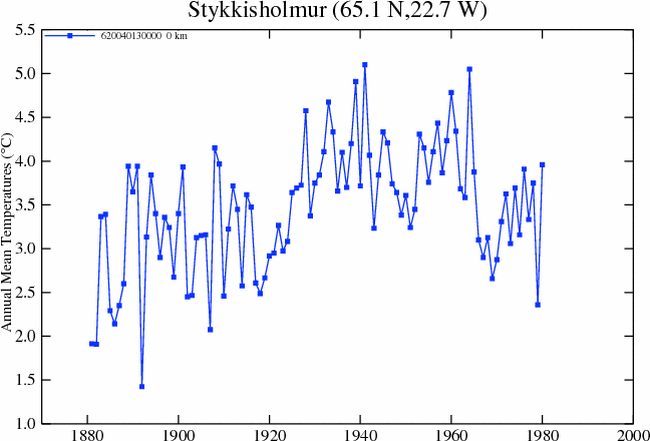
Climate graph of 1880–1980 average air temperatures at Stykkishólmur

A famous Icelander from Stykkishólmur is Sveinn Kristján Bjarnason. He was born in 1887 at Breiðabólstaður and emigrated with his parents from Stykkishólmur in 1889. Their destination was Winnipeg. In the United States, he became Edgar Holger Cahill. He worked as the National Director of the Federal Art Project through the WPA (Works Projects Administration) from 1935-1943. He was the Director of the Museum of Modern Art, a writer, curator, and expert on American folk art. He developed this work-relief program for artists under the New Deal by President Franklin D. Roosevelt. He is the interesting Icelander in this article:

In the 1986 novel Red Storm Rising, Stykkishólmur is the site of a landing by US Marines tasked with liberating Iceland from occupying Soviet forces.

Chess champion Bobby Fischer was planning on moving to Stykkishólmur before his sudden death in early 2008.

Stykkishólmur is the main setting in the short story Tussenlanding (Transfer) from the 1991 short story collection De Matador en andere verhalen by Tim Krabbé. The story features a Dutchman coming to Iceland in hope to start a relationship with an Icelandic woman he barely knows.

The town was the filming location for the depictions of Nuuk, Greenland in the 2013 movie The Secret Life of Walter Mitty.

== Town festival ==
Every year on the second or third weekend in August, the people in Stykkishólmur celebrate the Danskir dagar ("Danish days") festival, which honors the town's historic connections with Denmark. The festival has been held every year since 1994.

== Twin towns – sister cities ==
Stykkishólmur is twinned with:

- Drammen, Norway
- Kolding, Denmark
- Lappeenranta, Finland
- Örebro, Sweden
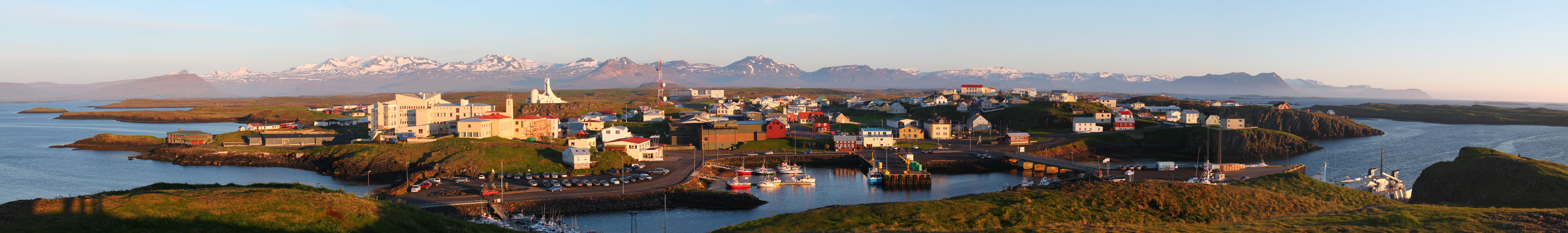
Stykkishólmur from the lighthouse

== Climate ==
Stykkishólmur features a subpolar oceanic climate moderated by the nearby ocean. It has cool summers, but also winter averages less cold than cities much further south featuring continental climates, such as Chicago, Sapporo or Toronto. April to July is the driest season, while autumn and winter is the wettest season.

Climate data for Stykkishólmur, 1991–2020 normals
Month	Jan	Feb	Mar	Apr	May	Jun	Jul	Aug	Sep	Oct	Nov	Dec	Year
Record high °C (°F)	10.9 (51.6)	10.5 (50.9)	12.2 (54.0)	16.4 (61.5)	18.4 (65.1)	21.0 (69.8)	21.0 (69.8)	20.8 (69.4)	18.5 (65.3)	15.7 (60.3)	13.3 (55.9)	13.4 (56.1)	21.0 (69.8)
Mean daily maximum °C (°F)	2.7 (36.9)	2.5 (36.5)	3.1 (37.6)	5.8 (42.4)	8.9 (48.0)	12.2 (54.0)	13.9 (57.0)	13.4 (56.1)	10.7 (51.3)	6.8 (44.2)	4.1 (39.4)	2.9 (37.2)	7.3 (45.1)
Daily mean °C (°F)	0.2 (32.4)	−0.2 (31.6)	0.3 (32.5)	2.6 (36.7)	5.7 (42.3)	8.9 (48.0)	10.7 (51.3)	10.5 (50.9)	8.1 (46.6)	4.4 (39.9)	1.8 (35.2)	0.4 (32.7)	4.5 (40.1)
Mean daily minimum °C (°F)	−2.2 (28.0)	−2.5 (27.5)	−1.9 (28.6)	0.3 (32.5)	3.2 (37.8)	6.4 (43.5)	8.4 (47.1)	8.3 (46.9)	6.0 (42.8)	2.5 (36.5)	−0.3 (31.5)	−2.0 (28.4)	2.2 (36.0)
Record low °C (°F)	−16.0 (3.2)	−17.7 (0.1)	−19.0 (−2.2)	−16.0 (3.2)	−6.7 (19.9)	−0.8 (30.6)	2.0 (35.6)	0.5 (32.9)	−4.9 (23.2)	−8.0 (17.6)	−11.8 (10.8)	−14.8 (5.4)	−19.0 (−2.2)
Average precipitation mm (inches)	81.2 (3.20)	82.2 (3.24)	73.2 (2.88)	45.0 (1.77)	40.3 (1.59)	32.0 (1.26)	34.0 (1.34)	50.9 (2.00)	78.0 (3.07)	68.1 (2.68)	69.0 (2.72)	84.5 (3.33)	738.4 (29.07)
Average precipitation days (≥ 1.0 mm)	14.3	13.6	12.8	9.5	8.9	7.3	7.3	10.0	12.5	12.6	12.4	13.8	135.0
Average snowy days (≥ 0 cm)	10.9	12.1	8.7	1.7	0.2	0.0	0.0	0.0	0.0	0.4	4.1	8.4	46.5
Source 1: Icelandic Meteorological Office
Source 2: NOAA

== See also ==
- List of settlements in Iceland
- Snæfellsjökull
