= KR (women's basketball) =

- Founded: 4 October 1956; 70 years ago
- History: KR; 1956–present
- Arena: DHL-Höllin
- Capacity: 1,500
- Location: Reykjavík, Iceland
- Team colors: Black, White
- Championships: 14 Úrvalsdeild kvenna
Home	Away

The KR women's basketball team, commonly known as KR, is the women's basketball department of Knattspyrnufélag Reykjavíkur and is based in Reykjavík, Iceland. It is the second winningest team in Úrvalsdeild kvenna history with 14 Icelandic championships, the last coming in 2010.

== Honors ==
- Úrvalsdeild kvenna (14):

1961, 1977, 1979, 1980, 1981, 1982, 1983, 1985, 1986, 1987, 1999, 2001, 2002, 2010

- Icelandic Basketball Cup (10):

1976, 1977, 1982, 1983, 1986, 1987, 1999, 2001, 2002, 2009

- Icelandic Basketball Super Cup (4):

1999, 2009, 2010, 2011

- Icelandic Company Cup (2):

2000, 2009

- Division I:

2018

== Season by season ==
Season	Tier	League	Pos.	W–L	Playoffs	Icelandic Cup
2009–10	1	Úrvalsdeild kvenna	1st	12–8	Champions	
2010–11	1	Úrvalsdeild kvenna	3rd	18–2	Runner-up	
2011–12	1	Úrvalsdeild kvenna	5th	13–15	DNQ	
2012–13	1	Úrvalsdeild kvenna	3rd	18–10	Runner-up	
2013–14	1	Úrvalsdeild kvenna	5th	11–17	DNQ	
2014–15	1	Úrvalsdeild kvenna	7th	5–23	DNQ	
2015–16	2	1. deild kvenna	2nd	13–7	Runner-up	
2016–17	2	1. deild kvenna	3rd	4–8	DNQ	
2017–18	2	1. deild kvenna	1st	24–0	Promoted	
2018–19	1	Úrvalsdeild kvenna	3rd	16–12	Semi-finals	
2019–20	1	Úrvalsdeild kvenna	2nd	18–7	N/A^{1}	
2020–21	1	Úrvalsdeild kvenna	8th	2–19	DNQ	
2021–22	2	1. deild kvenna				

Notes
^{1} 2020 playoffs canceled due to the Coronavirus pandemic in Iceland.

== Notable players ==
Criteria

To appear in this section a player must have either:

- Played at least three seasons for the club.
- Set a club record or won an individual award while at the club.
- Played at least one official international match for their national team at any time.
- Played at least one official WNBA match at any time.

- (Iceland) Anna Gunnarsdóttir
- (Finland) Annika Holopainen
- (Iceland) Björg Guðrún Einarsdóttir
- (Iceland) Björg Hafsteinsdóttir
- (Iceland) Danielle Rodriguez
- (Iceland) Emilía Sigurðardóttir
- (Iceland) Georgía Olga Kristiansen
- (Iceland) Gréta María Grétarsdóttir
- (Iceland) Guðbjörg Norðfjörð
- (Iceland) Guðrún Gestsdóttir
- (Iceland) Guðrún Ósk Ámundadóttir
- (Iceland) Hafrún Hálfdánardóttir
- (Iceland) Hanna Björg Kjartansdóttir
- (Iceland) Helga Árnadóttir
- (Iceland) Helga Einarsdóttir
- (Iceland) Helga Þorvaldsdóttir
- (Iceland) Hildur Björg Kjartansdóttir
- (Iceland) Hildur Sigurðardóttir
- (Iceland) Jóhanna Björk Sveinsdóttir
- (United States) Katie Wolfe
- (Iceland) Katrín Axelsdóttir
- (United States) Kiana Johnson
- (Iceland) Kristín Björk Jónsdóttir
- (Iceland) Lilja Björnsdóttir
- (Israel) Limor Mizrachi
- (Iceland) Linda Jónsdóttir
- (Iceland) Linda Stefánsdóttir
- (Iceland) Margrét Kara Sturludóttir
- (Iceland) María Guðmundsdóttir
- (Republic of Ireland) Orla O'Reilly
- (Iceland) Rebekka Rut Steingrímsdóttir
- (Iceland) Signý Hermannsdóttir
- (Iceland) Sigrún Cora Barker
- (Iceland) Sigrún Sjöfn Ámundadóttir
- (Iceland) Sóllilja Bjarnadóttir
- (United States) Tara Williams
- (Iceland) Telma Björk Fjalarsdóttir
- (Iceland) Unnur Tara Jónsdóttir

== Coaches ==
- (United States) John Hudson 1978–1979
- (Iceland) Sigurður Hjörleifsson 1980–1981
- (United States) Stewart Johnson 1981–1983
- (Iceland) Ágúst Líndal 1983–1984
- (Iceland) Jón Sigurðsson 1984
- (Iceland) Ingimar Jónsson 1984–1985
- (Iceland) Ágúst Líndal 1985–1987
- (Iceland) Emelía Sigurðardóttir 1987
- (Iceland) Jóhannes Kristbjörnsson 1988
- (Iceland) Sigurður Hjörleifsson 1988–1990
- (Iceland) Guðni Ólafur Guðnason 1990–1992
- (Iceland) Stefán Arnarson 1992–1994
- (Iceland) Óskar Kristjánsson 1994–1996
- (Iceland) Benedikt Guðmundsson 1996
- (Iceland) Svali Björgvinsson 1996–1997
- (United States) Chris Armstrong 1997–1998
- (Iceland) Óskar Kristjánsson 1998–2000
- (Iceland) Henning Henningsson 2000–2001
- (United States) Keith Vassell 2001–2002
- (Iceland) Ósvaldur Knudsen 2002–2003
- (Iceland) Atli Freyr Einarsson 2003
- (Iceland) Gréta María Grétarsdóttir 2003–2005
- (Serbia) Bojan Desnica 2005–2006
- (Iceland) Jóhannes Árnason 2007–2009
- (Iceland) Benedikt Guðmundsson 2009–2010
- (Iceland) Hrafn Kristjánsson 2010–2011
- (Iceland) Ari Gunnarsson 2011–2012
- (Iceland) Finnur Freyr Stefánsson 2012–2013
- (Iceland) Yngvi Páll Gunnlaugsson 2013–2014
- (Iceland) Finnur Jónsson 2014
- (Iceland) Hörður Unnsteinsson 2015
- (Iceland) Darri Freyr Atlason 2015–2016
- (Iceland) Heiðrún Kristmundsdóttir 2016–2017
- (Iceland) Benedikt Guðmundsson 2017–2020
- (Spain) Francisco Garcia 2020
- (Iceland) Jóhannes Árnason (interim) 2020
- (United States) Mike Denzel 2020–2021
- (Iceland) Hörður Unnsteinsson 2021–2025
- (Iceland) Daníel Andri Halldórsson 2025–
