= Breiðablik (women's basketball) =

- Arena: Smárinn
- Location: Kópavogur, Iceland
- Team colors: Green, white, red
- Head coach: Guillermo Sánchez
- Championships: 1 Úrvalsdeild kvenna
- Website: Breidablik.is
Home	Away

The Breiðablik women's basketball team, commonly known as Breiðablik, is the women's basketball department of the Breiðablik multi-sport club. It is based in Kópavogur, Iceland. As of 2018–2019 season its plays in the Icelandic top-tier Úrvalsdeild kvenna.

== History ==
During their first season in the Úrvaldeild in 1994–95, Breiðablik won the national championship after beating Keflavík in the finals.

In 2017 the club won promotion from 1. deild kvenna to the Úrvalsdeild.

In 2019, Breiðablik finished last in the league but was speared from relegation as Stjarnan withdrew its team from the Úrvalsdeild.

On 15 December 2023, Breiðablik withdrew its team from the Úrvalsdeild after several players terminated their contract and left the team. At the time of its withdrawal, the team had lost 12 of its 13 games.

== Honours ==
=== Titles ===
Úrvalsdeild kvenna

- Winners: 1995

Icelandic Supercup

- Winners: 1995

1. deild kvenna

- Winners (3): 1994, 2005, 2014

=== Individual awards ===
- Úrvalsdeild Women's Playoffs MVP
  - Penny Peppas - 1995
- Úrvalsdeild Women's Foreign Player of the Year
  - Betsy Harris - 1996
- Úrvalsdeild Women's Domestic All-First Team
  - Isabella Ósk Sigurðardóttir - 2021, 2022
- 1. deild kvenna Domestic MVP
  - Sóllilja Bjarnadóttir - 2017
- 1. deild kvenna All-First team
  - Sóllilja Bjarnadóttir - 2017
  - Telma Lind Ásgeirsdóttir - 2017
  - Isabella Ósk Sigurðardóttir - 2017
- 1. deild kvenna Young Player of the Year
  - Isabella Ósk Sigurðardóttir - 2016
- 1. deild kvenna Coach of the Year
  - Hildur Sigurðardóttir - 2017

== Notable players ==
Criteria

To appear in this section a player must have either:

- Played at least three seasons for the club.
- Set a club record or won an individual award while at the club.
- Played at least one official international match for their national team at any time.
- Played at least one official WNBA match at any time.

- (Iceland) Auður Íris Ólafsdóttir
- (Iceland) Birna Valgarðsdóttir
- (Iceland) Elín Sóley Hrafnkelsdóttir
- (Iceland) Elísa Vilbergsdóttir
- (Iceland) Hanna Björg Kjartansdóttir
- (Iceland) Hildur Sigurðardóttir
- (Iceland) Inga Dóra Magnúsdóttir
- (Iceland) Isabella Ósk Sigurðardóttir
- (Iceland) Jóhanna Björk Sveinsdóttir
- (United States) Kelly Faris
- (Iceland) Olga Færseth
- (United States) Penny Peppas
- (Serbia) Sanja Orozović
- (Iceland) Sóllilja Bjarnadóttir
- (Iceland) Telma Björk Fjalarsdóttir
- (United States) Whitney Knight

== Coaches ==
- (Iceland) Sigurður Hjörleifsson 1994–1996
- (Iceland) Birgir Mikaelsson 1996–1997
- (Iceland) Hildur Sigurðardóttir 2016–2018
- (Iceland) Margrét Sturlaugsdóttir 2018
- (Spain) Antonio D’Albero 2018–2019
- (Iceland) Ívar Ásgrímsson 2019–2022
- (Iceland) Yngvi Gunnlaugsson 2022
- (United States) Jeremy Herbert Smith 2022–2023
- (Spain) Guillermo Sánchez 2023
