= List of McDonnell Douglas MD-90 operators =

This is a list of airlines that have operated the McDonnell Douglas MD-90.

Major airlines that have operated the MD-90 include Delta Air Lines, Saudi Arabian Airlines, Japan Airlines, and UNI Air.

== Former operators ==
Country	Airline	Photo	Number of aircraft	Notes	Source
Aruba	Air Aruba		3	Ceased operations in 2000	
Egypt	AMC Airlines		5		
United States	American Airlines		5	Formerly operated by Reno Air	
Venezuela	Aserca Airlines		1	Leased from Air Aruba	
Finland	Blue1		5	Leased from Scandinavian Airlines	
Malta	BritishJET		1	Leased from Hello	
China	China Eastern Airlines		9	Sold to Delta Air Lines	
China	China Northern Airlines		13	Merged with China Southern Airlines in 2003	
China	China Southern Airlines		13	Sold to Delta Air Lines	
Turkey	Cyprus Turkish Airlines		2		
United States	Delta Air Lines		78 (Note: 65 were used in active service; the remaining 13 were used only for spare parts)	Launch customer and last operator	
Taiwan	EVA Air		7		
Taiwan	Great China Airlines		1	Rebranded as UNI Air in 1998	
Switzerland	Hello		6	Sold to Delta Air Lines	
Iceland	Iceland Express		4	Leased from Hello	
Japan	Japan Airlines		16	Sold to Delta Air Lines	
Japan	Japan Air System		16	Merged with Japan Airlines in 2006	
Sweden	Nordic Airways		2	Leased from Scandinavian Airlines	
Indonesia	Lion Air		5		
Saudi Arabia	Saudia		29	Only operator of the MD-90EFD (Enhanced Flight Deck)	
Sweden, Norway, Denmark	Scandinavian Airlines		8		
Turkey	Turkish Airlines		2		
Taiwan	UNI Air		14		

U.S. based start-up air carrier Pro Air ordered the MD-90 but did not operate the aircraft prior to ceasing operations and going out of business.

Alaska Airlines considered ordering the MD-90 but did not take delivery of the type or operate the aircraft and none were manufactured for the airline.
