= Skúli =

Skúli [ˈskuːlɪ] or Skuli is an Icelandic masculine given name and may refer to:

- Skúli Bárðarson, Old Norse name form of Skule Bårdsson (c. 1189–1240), Norwegian nobleman
- Skúli Jón Friðgeirsson (born 1988), Icelandic footballer
- Skúli Helgason (born 1965), Icelandic politician
- Skuli Jonsson (1892–1943), Canadian ice hockey player
- Skúli Magnússon (1711–1794), Icelandic civil servant
- Skúli Mogensen (born 1968), Icelandic investor and entrepreneur
- Skúli Nielsen (born 1937), Icelandic footballer
- Skúli Óskarsson (1948–2024), Icelandic powerlifter
- Skuli Sigfusson (1870–1969), Canadian politician
- Skúli Sverrisson (born 1966), Icelandic composer and bass guitarist
- Skúli Thoroddsen (1859–1916), Icelandic judge and politician
- Skúli Þórsteinsson (11th-century), Icelandic poet and warrior

== See also ==
- Skúlason, patronymic meaning "son of Skúli"
