= Skúli Mogensen =

Icelandic investor and entrepreneur (born 1968)

- Born: 18 September 1968 (age 58); Reykjavík, Iceland
- Occupation: Business person
- Parents: Brynjólfur Árni Mogensen; Anna Skúladóttir

Skúli Mogensen (born 18 September 1968) is an Icelandic investor and entrepreneur. He founded and is CEO of Hvammsvik Hot Springs and Nature Resort which opened in 2022. He owns the investment firm Títan, founded OZ Communications, and founded and was sole owner and CEO of the Iceland-based budget airline WOW air, which went bankrupt on 28 March 2019.

== Early life and education ==
Skúli's mother, Anna Skúladóttir, is a former financial director for the city of Reykjavík; his father, Brynjólfur Mogensen, is an orthopedist and Skúli spent much of his childhood in Sweden while his father was studying there. He was an exchange student in San Diego in California, then studied philosophy at the University of Iceland; he co-founded his first business, OZ Communications, as a student and dropped out when the company took off.

== Career ==
Skúli served as CEO of OZ for 18 years until the company was sold to Nokia in 2008. He was among the founders of Scandic hf. (in 1993), Íslandssími and Arctic Ventures. He registered Títan investment firm in Iceland in October 2009; in 2011 Skúli led a buyout of MP Bank.

He founded WOW air in November 2011, and took over as CEO from Baldur Baldursson the following year. On 28 March 2019, the day the company ceased operations, he wrote a letter to employees apologising "for not taking action sooner". WOW air was named Low Cost Airline of the year in 2018 by CAPA.

Skúli was a board member at Securitas, MP Bank, Kvika bank, Datamarket, Redline Communications, Carbon Recycling International, Thor Datacenter and other companies.

Skúli is founder and CEO of Títan Fjárfestingarfélag which is his private investment firm with holdings primarily in the travel, tourism and leisure markets along with real estate investments and early technology investments.

Skúli Mogensen was named Iceland's Businessman of the Year in 2011 and 2016. Skúli Mogensen was awarded IMARKs marketing person of the year 2017

In 2011, Skúli Mogensen bought the farms Hvammur and Hvammsvík in Hvalfjörður from Reykjavík Energy, with plans to develop the land for tourism and outdoor recreation. He and Gríma Björg Thorarensen developed the site into Hvammsvík Hot Springs, which opened in 2022. Skúli worked on the design of the pools, while Thorarensen designed the interiors. The site has eight geothermal pools on the shoreline, mixed with seawater, along with a restaurant and guest cabins. Hvammsvík is mentioned in Landnámabók as the farm of the settler Hvamm-Þórir. During the Second World War it was the site of a British and American naval base, and the main building of the baths stands on the ruins of that base.

== Private life ==
He was formerly married to Margrét Ásgeirsdóttir, a physician; they moved to Canada in 2002, while he was running OZ, and lived there until 2010. They have three children and divorced in 2013.

Skúli has been in a relationship with interior designer Gríma Björg Thorarensen since 2017. The couple have two sons, born in 2020 and 2021. They married on August 16th 2025 at Hvammsvík, in a Temple that Skúli had designed for the wedding. The structure is built of exposed concrete cast on site and is open to the elements, with a roof in the shape of a Maltese cross. Skúli cited the Pantheon in Rome and the work of Tadao Ando as influences.
