= Fanney Lind Thomas =

Icelandic basketball player

Personal information
- Born: 13 December 1989 (age 36) Iceland
- Listed height: 178 cm (5 ft 10 in)

Career information
- Playing career: 2003–2022
- Position: Forward
- Number: 6, 7, 14, 15, 22

Career history
- 2003–2004: Hamar
- 2004–2006: Hamar/Selfoss
- 2006–2011: Hamar
- 2011–2012: US La Glacerie
- 2012: Hamar
- 2012–2013: Fjölnir
- 2013–2014: Hamar
- 2014–2015: Valur
- 2015–2016: Þór Akureyri
- 2016–2017: Skallagrímur
- 2019: Tindastóll
- 2019–2021: Breiðablik
- 2021–2022: Aþena-UMFK

Career highlights
- Icelandic D1 champion (2006); Icelandic D1 Domestic All-First Team (2016); 6× Icelandic All-Star (2008–2011, 2013, 2014)

Fanney Lind Guðmundsdóttir Thomas (born 13 December 1989) is an Icelandic former basketball player. She is a former member of the Icelandic national basketball team.

== Career ==
Fanney came up through the junior ranks of Hamar, playing her first senior match during the 2007–2008 season. She was a key player on the Hamar team that advanced to the 2010 Úrvalsdeild kvenna finals where it lost to KR in five games. In 2011, she joined French club Union Sportive de La Glacerie.

She spent the next three seasons with Fjölnir, Hamar and Valur before signing with Þór Akureyri in 1. deild kvenna prior to the 2015–2016 season. She was named to the Domestic All-First Team after averaging 13.4 and 7.9 rebounds per game for the season.

In November, 2016, Fanney left Þór Akureyri and joined newly promoted Skallagrímur in the Úrvalsdeild kvenna. She helped Skallagrímur to the Icelandic Cup finals in 2017, scoring 11 points in a losing effort against Keflavík. In the playoffs, she averaged 8.2 points and 5.6 rebounds but was unable to prevent Skallagrímur from losing against Keflavík, 2–3, in the semi-finals.

On 12 November 2017, Fanney announced she was stepping away from basketball due to head injuries she sustained in a game against Valur a month earlier.

On 12 January 2019, she had a one-game comeback to the court with Tindastóll, going scoreless in 11 minutes in an overtime victory against Njarðvík in 1. deild kvenna.

In September 2019, Fanney signed with Úrvalsdeild kvenna club Breiðablik.

After two seasons with Breiðablik, Fanney signed with 1. deild club Aþena-UMFK in October 2021. In 14 games, she averaged 6.4 points and 5.9 rebounds per game.

== Icelandic national team ==
Fanney played five games for the Icelandic U-16 national team in 2005. In 2008, she played 3 games for the Icelandic national basketball team.

== Personal life ==
Fanney is married to Danero Thomas, a professional basketball player and a former member of Murray State.
