= Frosti Sigurjónsson =

Icelandic politician

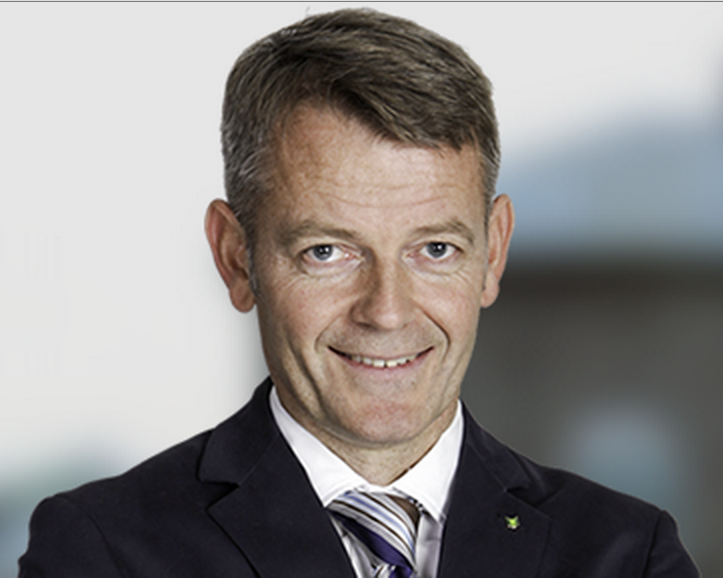
Frosti Sigurjónsson in 2013

Frosti Sigurjónsson (born December 19, 1962, in Reykjavík) is an Icelandic businessman, economist, and politician. He was a member of parliament for the Progressive Party from 2013 to 2016.

Frosti has an MBA from the London Business School (1991). He has had prominent roles in various Icelandic companies. From 1999 to 2005 he served as chair of the board of CCP Games. In 2005 he co-founded the travel search engine Dohop where he served until 2010 as managing director and then as CEO. He was also co-founder and from 2009 to 2013 CEO of DataMarket, a company active in the field of information visualization.

Following the Icelandic parliamentary elections of April 27, 2013 Frosti was a member of the Icelandic parliament for the constituency Reykjavík North. He was Chairman of the Parliament Committee on Economic Affairs and Trade and Member of the Committee on Foreign Affairs.

Frosti Sigurjónsson announced in 2016 that he would not to stand for re-election in Iceland.

== Reform of the Icelandic monetary system ==
In spring of 2015, Frosti Sigurjónsson was commissioned by the then Icelandic Prime Minister Sigmundur Davíð Gunnlaugsson, to find out why the 2008 financial crisis affected Iceland particularly hard. In his study Frosti concludes that the main problem lies in the creation of money on the deposit money banks. Frosti advocates monetary control by the state. This corresponds to the objectives pursued and the Association for Monetary modernization of the Swiss Hansruedi Weber.
