= Sturgis Brown High School =

Coordinates: 44.4745°N 103.306978°W

- 12930 E. Hwy 34; Sturgis, SD 57785; United States

Information
- Type: Public
- Motto: "To Build Knowledge and Skills For Success Today and Tomorrow"
- School district: Meade School District
- Principal: Pete Wilson
- Teaching staff: 50.82 (FTE)
- Enrollment: 839 (2023-2024)
- Student to teacher ratio: 16.51
- Colors: Black, white and red
- Mascot: Scooper Sam
- Team name: Scoopers
- Accreditation: North Central Association Commission on Accreditation and School Improvement
- Yearbook: Mato Paha
- Information: (605) 347-2686
- Website: meade.k12.sd.us/sbhs

Sturgis Brown High School is located in Sturgis, South Dakota and is part of the Meade School District. Located east of Sturgis at 12930 E. Hwy 34, the school draws students from all over the city.

== Notable alumni ==
- Bobby Buntrock, child actor who played Harold Baxter on the 1960s sitcom Hazel
- Raymond W. Carpenter, United States Army officer
- Carroll Hardy, NFL and MLB player
- Marty Jackley, Attorney General of South Dakota
- Megan Mahoney, professional basketball player
- Doug Miller, NFL player
