= Maddie Sutton =

American basketball player

No. 22 – Tindastóll
- Position: Power forward
- League: Úrvalsdeild kvenna

Personal information
- Born: 13 December 1998 (age 27) Champaign, Illinois, U.S.
- Listed height: 182 cm (6 ft 0 in)

Career information
- High school: Heritage (Maryville, Tennessee)
- College: Tusculum (2017–2021)
- Playing career: 2021–present

Career history
- 2021–2022: Tindastóll
- 2022–2025: Þór Akureyri
- 2025: Joondalup Wolves
- 2025–present: Tindastóll

Career highlights
- Icelandic Super Cup winner (2024); 2× Úrvalsdeild kvenna rebounding leader (2025, 2026); 1. deild kvenna rebounding leader (2022)

Madison Anne Sutton (born 13 December 1998) is an American professional basketball player. She played college basketball for Tusculum University before embarking on a professional career in Iceland. She led the Úrvalsdeild kvenna in rebounds in 2025 and 2026.

== Early life ==
Sutton was born in Champaign, Illinois, in the United States and is one of nine siblings. She attended Heritage High School in Maryville, Tennessee.

== College career ==
In 2017, Sutton joined Tusculum University where she played college basketball for four years. During her senior year, she averaged 17.3 points and 14.6 rebounds per game while receiving D2CCA First-Team All-American honors.

== Professional career ==
After graduation, Sutton signed with Tindastóll in the Icelandic second-tier 1. deild kvenna where she went on to lead the league in rebounds for the 2021–22 season.

Sutton joined Þór Akureyri for the 2022–23 season and helped the team to a promotion to the top-tier Úrvalsdeild kvenna for 2023–24 for the first time in 45 years. She was the second leading rebounder in the 1. deild in during the 2022–23 season. During the 2023–24 season, Sutton was the second leading rebounder in the Úrvalsdeild and led the team to the Úrvalsdeild playoffs. She also helped Þór finish as the runner-up in the Icelandic Cup, losing the final to Keflavík. On December 3, 2024, she posted a triple double with 18 points, 24 rebounds and 17 assists. On December 10, she posted her third straight triple double with 11 points, 16 rebounds and 11 assists in a win against Valur. For the season she averaged 15.2 points, 6.7 assists and a league leading 16.5 rebounds per game.

On March 22, 2025, Sutton signed with the Joondalup Wolves of the NBL1 West in Australia for the 2025 season.

After initially agreeing to play for Stjarnan for the 2025–2026 season, she later signed with Tindastóll. On 4 November 2025, she became the third player in the Úrvalsdeild history to have at least 30 points, 20 rebounds and 10 assists in a single game. She rejoined Tindastóll for the 2026-2027 season in end of October 2026.

== National team ==
In December 2024, Sutton indicated her interest in playing for the Iceland women's national basketball team.
