= Megan Mahoney =

American basketball player (born 1983)

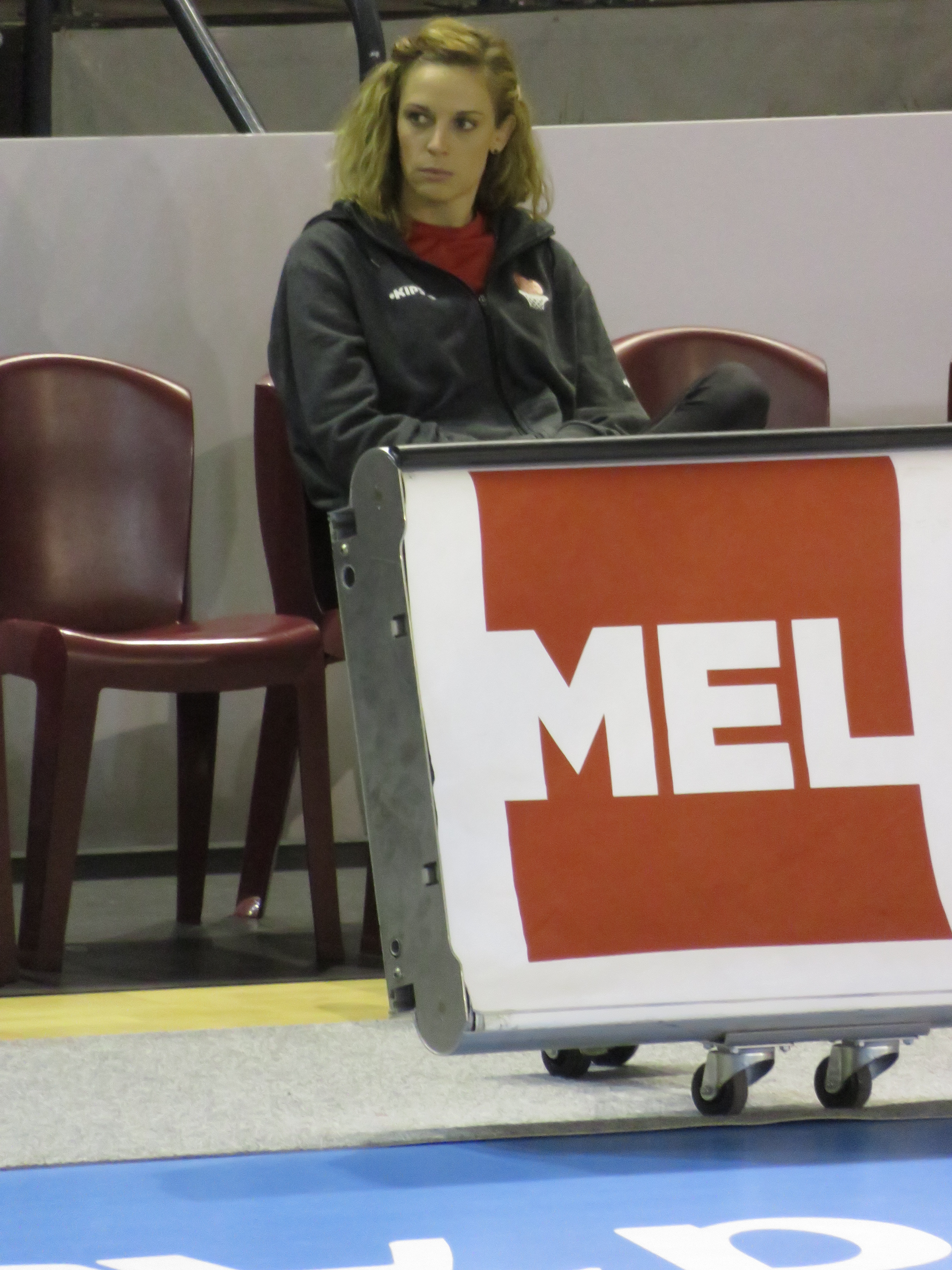
- Mahoney in 2016

Personal information
- Born: February 13, 1983 (age 43) Rapid City, South Dakota, U.S.
- Listed height: 1.83 m (6 ft 0 in)
- Listed weight: 72 kg (159 lb)

Career information
- High school: Sturgis Brown (Sturgis, South Dakota)
- College: Kansas State (2001–2005)
- WNBA draft: 2005: 3rd round, 34th overall pick
- Drafted by: Connecticut Sun
- Playing career: 2005–2019
- Position: Forward
- Number: 4, 34

Career history
- 2006: Haukar
- 2006–2007: Connecticut Sun
- 2006–2008: Basket Parma
- 2008–2013: Cras Basket Taranto
- 2013–2014: La Lucca
- 2014–2016: ESB Villeneuve-d'Ascq
- 2016–2018: ASD San Martino di Lupari

Career highlights
- 3x Italian champion (2009, 2010, 2012); EuroCup Women (2015); Icelandic champion (2006); Serie A1 Finals MVP (2010); Úrvalsdeild Playoffs MVP (2006); Úrvalsdeild Foreign Player of the Year (2006); Icelandic All-Star (2006); Icelandic All-Star Game MVP (2006); First-team All-Big 12 (2003)
- Stats at Basketball Reference

Megan Marie Mahoney (born February 13, 1983) is an American former professional basketball player. During her 14-year career, Mahoney won the Italian championship three times, in 2009, 2010 and 2012, and the Icelandic championship in 2006. In 2015, she won the EuroCup with ESB Villeneuve-d'Ascq. Mahoney was drafted by the Connecticut Sun in 2005 and played in the WNBA from 2006 to 2007.

== Early life and college ==
Mahoney attended Sturgis Brown High School in Sturgis, South Dakota. As a senior, she was named Gatorade and USA Today South Dakota Player of the Year, High School Girls Athlete of the Year by the South Dakota Sports Writers Association, and Miss Basketball South Dakota. Mahoney also excelled academically, earning membership in the National Honor Society.

Mahoney attended Kansas State University and was a 2003 All Big-12 First Team selection. During her career, she set the all-time school record for assists (589), and she ranks second all-time in assist-to-turnover ratio (1.62).

== Career statistics ==
Legend
GP	Games played	GS	Games started	MPG	Minutes per game	RPG	Rebounds per game
APG	Assists per game	SPG	Steals per game	BPG	Blocks per game	PPG	Points per game
TO	Turnovers per game	FG%	Field-goal percentage	3P%	3-point field-goal percentage	FT%	Free-throw percentage
**Bold**	Career best	°	League leader

=== WNBA ===
==== Regular season ====
Year	Team	GP	GS	MPG	FG%	3P%	FT%	RPG	APG	SPG	BPG	TO	PPG
2006	Connecticut	**31**	**1**	**11.3**	**30.6**	**24.1**	**89.5**	**2.1**	**0.8**	0.2	0.0	0.8	**2.5**
2007	Connecticut	18	0	6.7	25.0	16.7	72.7	0.8	0.4	0.2	**0.1**	**0.6**	1.7
Career	2 years, 1 team	49	1	9.6	29.2	22.9	80.5	1.6	0.7	0.2	0.0	0.7	2.2

==== Playoffs ====
Year	Team	GP	GS	MPG	FG%	3P%	FT%	RPG	APG	SPG	BPG	TO	PPG
2006	Connecticut	**4**	0	3.3	0.0	0.0	0.0	0.5	0.0	0.0	0.0	0.5	0.0
2007	Connecticut	2	0	**5.5**	**75.0**	0.0	**50.0**	**1.5**	0.0	**0.5**	0.0	**0.0**	**3.5**
Career	2 years, 1 team	6	0	4.0	37.5	0.0	50.0	0.8	0.0	0.2	0.0	0.3	1.2

=== College ===
Legend
GP	Games played	GS	Games started	MPG	Minutes per game
FG%	Field goal percentage	3P%	3-point field goal percentage	FT%	Free throw percentage
RPG	Rebounds per game	APG	Assists per game	SPG	Steals per game
BPG	Blocks per game	PPG	Points per game	**Bold**	Career high

Year	Team	GP	Points	FG%	3P%	FT%	RPG	APG	SPG	BPG	PPG
2001–02	Kansas State	**34**	286	44.9	37.0	66.2	5.4	4.6	**1.6**	0.4	8.4
2002–03	Kansas State	**34**	**473**	**50.0**	**43.4**	74.0	6.4	4.8	1.5	0.3	**13.9**
2003–04	Kansas State	31	259	46.0	32.4	66.7	**7.0**	**5.2**	1.2	**0.5**	8.4
2004–05	Kansas State	30	289	47.9	23.9	**80.0**	6.2	3.5	1.3	**0.5**	9.6
Career	Kansas State	129	1307	47.5	36.7	71.9	6.2	4.6	1.4	0.4	10.1

== Career ==
In the 2005 WNBA draft, Mahoney was selected in the third round (34th overall) by the Connecticut Sun. A torn Achilles during the Big 12 championship game her senior season prevented her from playing with the Sun during the 2005 season.

Mahoney signed with Haukar of the Icelandic Úrvalsdeild kvenna in January 2006, replacing KeKe Tardy. In nine regular season games, she averaged 27.9 points and 13.1 rebounds per game, helping the team achieve the best record in the league. In the playoffs, Mahoney averaged 28.3 points and 14.3 rebounds. In the finals she broke Penny Peppas' scoring record by averaging 32.0 points and helped Haukar to a three-game sweep of Keflavík. For her effort she was named the Úrvalsdeild Playoffs MVP and the Úrvalsdeild Foreign Player of the Year.

In February 2006, Mahoney signed a three-year contract with the Connecticut Sun. During her first season (2006), Mahoney appeared in 31 games, starting once, and averaged 11.7 minutes per game.

On March 6, 2008, the Connecticut Sun traded Mahoney to the Houston Comets in exchange for Barbara Turner. On April 29, 2008, Mahoney was waived by the Comets.

In 2006 and in 2007, Megan played in Italy with Parma and the next year, she started to play with Cras Basket Taranto and she won the Italian title in 2008/2009 2009/2010 (MVP of the finals) 2011/2012

In 2010–2011, during the Euroleague Women, Mahoney was called in the "Rest of World" team against the Representatives of Europe. She scored eight points in five minutes.

Between 2014 and 2016, Mahoney played in France for ESB Villeneuve-d'Ascq. She won the EuroCup Women 2015 and was runner-up the following season, and also came second in the 2014–15 Ligue Féminine de Basketball.

Mahoney signed with San Martino di Lupari of the Italian Serie A1. On January 15, 2017, she tore her anterior cruciate ligament of the right knee and missed the rest of the season. In May, 2017, Mahoney re-signed with San Martion for the 2017–2018 season.

Mahoney had planned to play the 2018–2019 season in Belgium, but tore a tendon in her foot prior to the start of the season. The injury required a surgery and six to eight months of rehabbing. In June 2019, Mahoney announced her retirement from basketball.

== Titles and awards ==
=== Titles ===
- EuroCup Women: 2015.
- Italian Champion: 2009, 2010, 2012
- Icelandic champion: 2006

=== Awards ===
- Serie A1 Finals MVP: 2010
- Úrvalsdeild Foreign Player of the Year: 2006
- Úrvalsdeild Playoffs MVP: 2006
- Icelandic All-Star MVP: 2009
