= 2024–25 Wyoming Cowgirls basketball team =

American college basketball season

2024–25 Wyoming Cowgirls basketball

WBIT, First Round
- Conference: Mountain West Conference
- Record: 22–12 (14–4 MW)
- Head coach: Heather Ezell (3rd season)
- Assistant coaches: Fallon Lewis; Natalie Baker; Taylor Ignoto; Monica Brooks
- Home arena: Arena-Auditorium

2024–25 Mountain West Conference women's basketball standings
	Conf.				Overall
Team	W		L	PCT	W		L	PCT
UNLV	16	–	2	.889	26	–	8	.765
Wyoming	14	–	4	.778	22	–	12	.647
Colorado State	13	–	5	.722	22	–	10	.688
San Diego State †	11	–	7	.611	25	–	10	.714
New Mexico	11	–	7	.611	18	–	14	.563
Fresno State	8	–	10	.444	19	–	15	.559
Air Force	7	–	11	.389	18	–	15	.545
Boise State	7	–	11	.389	18	–	15	.545
Nevada	6	–	12	.333	11	–	21	.344
Utah State	3	–	15	.167	4	–	27	.129
San Jose State	3	–	15	.167	10	–	22	.313
† 2025 Mountain West tournament winner

The 2024–25 Wyoming Cowgirls basketball team represented the University of Wyoming during the 2024–25 NCAA Division I women's basketball season. The Cowgirls, who were led by third-year head coach Heather Ezell, played their home games at the Arena-Auditorium in Laramie, Wyoming, as members of the Mountain West Conference.

== Previous season ==
The Cowgirls finished the 2023–24 season 18–15, 11–7 in Mountain West play, to finish in third place. They were upset by #6 seed Boise State in the quarterfinals of the Mountain West tournament. They received an at-large bid to the WNIT, where they would defeat UTSA in the second round, and South Dakota in the Super 16, before falling to eventual tournament runner-up Minnesota in the Great 8.

== Preseason ==
On October 16, 2024, the Mountain West Conference released their preseason coaches poll. Wyoming was picked to finish second in the Mountain West regular season.

=== Preseason rankings ===
Mountain West preseason poll
Predicted finish	Team	Votes (1st place)
1	UNLV	298 (21)
2	Wyoming	251 (3)
3	Colorado State	248 (4)
4	Boise State	221
5	San Diego State	218 (2)
6	New Mexico	172
7	Nevada	125
8	Air Force	116
9	Fresno State	109
10	San Jose State	60
11	Utah State	41

=== Mountain West Preseason Co-Player of the Year ===
Mountain West Preseason Co-Player of the Year
Player	Position	Year
Allyson Fertig	Center	Senior

=== Preseason All-Mountain West Team ===
Preseason All-Mountain West Team
Player	Position	Year
Allyson Fertig	Center	Senior

== Roster ==
2024–25 Wyoming Cowgirls women's basketball team
Players
Coaches

Pos.	#	Name	Height	Year	Previous school	Hometown
F	1	Logann Alvar	6 ft 0 in (1.83 m)	Jr	Casper College	Casper, Wyoming
G	2	Emily Mellema	5 ft 11 in (1.8 m)	Sr	Lynden Christian School	Lynden, Washington
G	3	Payton Muma	5 ft 8 in (1.73 m)	RS So	Gonzaga	Highlands Ranch, Colorado
F	4	Fia Proctor	6 ft 2 in (1.88 m)	Fr	Bothell High School	Bothell, Washington
G/F	5	Tess Barnes	6 ft 2 in (1.88 m)	Sr	Maribyrnong College	Gisborne, Australia
G	10	Lana Beslic	5 ft 8 in (1.73 m)	Fr	Western Reserve Academy	Split, Croatia
F	11	Madi Symons	6 ft 0 in (1.83 m)	So	Coeur d'Alene High School	Coeur d'Alene, Idaho
G	12	Malene Pedersen	5 ft 11 in (1.8 m)	Jr	Kansas State	Aabyhøj, Denmark
G/F	13	Karoline Lundin	5 ft 9 in (1.75 m)	Fr	Marbo Basket	Copenhagen, Denmark
G	14	Kati Ollilainen	5 ft 9 in (1.75 m)	So	HBA-Märsky	Helsinki, Finland
F/C	15	Heidur Karlsdottir	6 ft 4 in (1.93 m)	Fr	Fjölnir	Egilsstaðir, Iceland
G	23	Joslin Igo	5 ft 6 in (1.68 m)	Sr	Casper College	Douglas, Wyoming
G	25	Mikyn Hamlin	5 ft 8 in (1.73 m)	So	Hugoton High School	Hugoton, Kansas
G	30	Ola Ustowska	5 ft 10 in (1.78 m)	GS	SMS PZKosz Lomianki	Kartuzy, Poland
G	42	McKinley Dickerson	5 ft 11 in (1.8 m)	GS	Lyman High School	Lyman, Wyoming
C	45	Allyson Fertig	6 ft 4 in (1.93 m)	Sr	Douglas High School	Glendo, Wyoming

Head coach

- Heather Ezell (Iowa State)

Assistant coach(es)

- Fallon Lewis (Wyoming)
- Natalie Baker (Wyoming)
- Taylor Ignoto (Washburn)
- Monica Brooks (Colorado Mesa)

Legend

- (C) Team captain
- (S) Suspended
- (I) Ineligible
- (W) Walk-on
- Injured
- Current redshirt

Roster
Last update: March 22, 2025

== Postseason honors and awards ==
All-Mountain West Team
Player	Position	Year
Allyson Fertig	Center	Senior
Malene Pedersen	Guard	Junior

Mountain West All Defensive Team
Player	Position	Year
Allyson Fertig	Center	Senior
Emily Mellema	Guard	Senior

Mountain West Player of the Year
Player	Position	Year
Allyson Fertig	Center	Senior

Mountain West Defensive Player of the Year
Player	Position	Year
Emily Mellema	Guard	Senior

== Schedule and results ==
Date time, TV	Rank^{#}	Opponent^{#}	Result	Record	High points	High rebounds	High assists	Site (attendance) city, state
Exhibition
November 1, 2024*; 5:30 pm		Chadron State	W 78–39	–	22 – Fertig	10 – Fertig	7 – Barnes	Arena-Auditorium; Laramie, WY
Non-conference regular season
November 4, 2024*; 5:30 pm, MWN		Colorado	L 50–56	0–1	18 – Fertig	7 – Barnes	4 – Pedersen	Arena-Auditorium (3,866); Laramie, WY
November 9, 2024*; 2:00 pm, ESPN+		at BYU	L 63–76	0–2	22 – Fertig	18 – Fertig	4 – Mellema	Marriott Center (1,396); Provo, UT
November 13, 2024*; 6:30 pm, MWN		Regis	W 69–57	1–2	21 – Fertig	8 – Symons	5 – Ustowska	Arena-Auditorium (2,087); Laramie, WY
November 17, 2024*; 2:00 pm, ESPN+		at Gonzaga	L 51–62	1–3	27 – Mellema	10 – Fertig	4 – Symons	McCarthey Athletic Center (5,288); Spokane, WA
November 22, 2024*; 11:00 am, MWN		Colorado Christian	W 80–54	2–3	22 – Fertig	12 – Fertig	5 – Mellema	Arena-Auditorium (4,766); Laramie, WY
November 28, 2024*; 11:30 am, FloHoops		vs. Drake; Discover Puerto Rico Shootout	W 71–57	3–3	20 – Mellema	9 – Fertig	4 – Mellema	Coliseo Guillermo Angulo (250); Carolina, PR
November 29, 2024*; 11:30 am, FloHoops		vs. Norfolk State; Discover Puerto Rico Shootout	L 47–56	3–4	19 – Fertig	21 – Fertig	5 – Pedersen	Coliseo Guillermo Angulo (250); Carolina, PR
November 30, 2024*; 10:30 am, FloHoops		vs. Virginia; Discover Puerto Rico Shootout	W 71–66	4–4	23 – Pedersen	13 – Mellema	6 – Mellema	Coliseo Guillermo Angulo (250); Carolina, PR
December 6, 2024*; 5:30 pm, ESPN+		at Missouri State	L 50–62	4–5	15 – Fertig	10 – Fertig	3 – Tied	Great Southern Bank Arena (2,155); Springfield, MO
December 15, 2024*; 12:00 pm, SLN		at South Dakota	W 79–45	5–5	17 – Fertig	9 – Fertig	6 – Pedersen	Sanford Coyote Sports Center (1,485); Vermillion, SD
December 17, 2024*; 5:00 pm, FloHoops		at Creighton	L 60–76	5–6	23 – Fertig	9 – Ustowska	5 – Tied	D. J. Sokol Arena (1,066); Omaha, NE
December 21, 2024*; 1:00 pm, MWN		North Dakota	W 73–41	6–6	16 – Barnes	8 – Fertig	4 – Tied	Arena-Auditorium (2,311); Laramie, WY
Mountain West regular season
January 1, 2025; 2:00 pm, MWN		Utah State	W 73–53	7–6 (1–0)	22 – Pedersen	9 – Fertig	6 – Mellema	Arena-Auditorium (2,463); Laramie, WY
January 4, 2025; 3:00 pm, MWN		at Fresno State	W 68–59	8–6 (2–0)	24 – Barnes	7 – Fertig	3 – Tied	Save Mart Center (1,196); Fresno, CA
January 8, 2025; 7:00 pm, MWN		at New Mexico	L 67–73	8–7 (2–1)	17 – Fertig	6 – Fertig	7 – Pedersen	The Pit (4,470); Albuquerque, NM
January 11, 2025; 2:00 pm, MWN		San Diego State	W 78–71	9–7 (3–1)	21 – Fertig	9 – Fertig	5 – Mellema	Arena-Auditorium (2,344); Laramie, WY
January 15, 2025; 6:30 pm, MWN		Nevada	W 66–61	10–7 (4–1)	21 – Fertig	12 – Fertig	5 – Mellema	Arena-Auditorium (1,958); Laramie, WY
January 19, 2025; 2:00 pm, CBSSN		at UNLV	L 71–72 ^{OT}	10–8 (4–2)	22 – Fertig	9 – Fertig	6 – Mellema	Cox Pavilion (1,410); Paradise, NV
January 22, 2025; 4:00 pm, MWN		at Air Force	W 62–50	11–8 (5–2)	16 – Pedersen	9 – Fertig	4 – Tied	Clune Arena (466); Colorado Springs, CO
January 25, 2025; 2:00 pm, MWN		Colorado State; Border War	L 56–61	11–9 (5–3)	34 – Fertig	15 – Fertig	9 – Ustowska	Arena-Auditorium (2,692); Laramie, WY
January 29, 2025; 7:00 pm, MWN		at San Jose State	W 77–64	12–9 (6–3)	20 – Pedersen	8 – Fertig	8 – Ustowska	Provident Credit Union Event Center (286); San Jose, CA
February 1, 2025; 2:00 pm, MWN		Boise State	W 79–45	13–9 (7–3)	22 – Tied	17 – Fertig	6 – Ustowska	Arena-Auditorium (2,716); Laramie, WY
February 8, 2025; 2:00 pm, MWN		at San Diego State	W 64–51	14–9 (8–3)	20 – Fertig	6 – Tied	6 – Pedersen	Viejas Arena (1,830); San Diego, CA
February 12, 2025; 6:30 pm, MWN		Air Force	W 64–56	15–9 (9–3)	30 – Fertig	15 – Fertig	3 – Tied	Arena-Auditorium (2,163); Laramie, WY
February 15, 2025; 2:00 pm, MWN		San Jose State	W 59–54	16–9 (10–3)	21 – Pedersen	16 – Fertig	3 – Tied	Arena-Auditorium (2,454); Laramie, WY
February 18, 2025; 6:30 pm, MWN		at Boise State	L 73–78	16–10 (10–4)	18 – Mellema	12 – Fertig	5 – Pedersen	ExtraMile Arena (1,594); Boise, ID
February 22, 2025; 7:30 pm, MWN		at Nevada	W 45–42	17–10 (11–4)	13 – Barnes	6 – Pedersen	3 – Ustowska	Lawlor Events Center (1,608); Reno, NV
February 26, 2025; 6:30 pm, MWN		New Mexico	W 59–40	18–10 (12–4)	15 – Fertig	9 – Fertig	4 – Barnes	Arena-Auditorium (2,191); Laramie, WY
March 1, 2025; 6:00 pm, MWN		at Colorado State; Border War	W 68–55	19–10 (13–4)	16 – Pedersen	17 – Fertig	5 – Tied	Moby Arena (2,612); Fort Collins, CO
March 5, 2025; 8:30 pm, FS1		UNLV	W 71–66	20–10 (14–4)	27 – Pedersen	19 – Fertig	5 – Tied	Arena-Auditorium (3,601); Laramie, WY
Mountain West tournament
March 10, 2025; 6:00 pm, MWN	(2)	vs. (7) Air Force; Quarterfinals	W 77–64	21–10	22 – Fertig	13 – Fertig	5 – Mellema	Thomas & Mack Center; Paradise, NV
March 11, 2025; 8:30 pm, MWN	(2)	vs. (6) Fresno State; Semifinals	W 57–45	22–10	17 – Fertig	18 – Fertig	8 – Pedersen	Thomas & Mack Center (2,052); Paradise, NV
March 12, 2025; 8:30 pm, CBSSN	(2)	vs. (4) San Diego State; Championship	L 68–72 ^{3OT}	22–11	19 – Pedersen	18 – Fertig	6 – Barnes	Thomas & Mack Center (2,797); Paradise, NV
WBIT
March 20, 2025*; 6:30 pm, ESPN+	(4)	Texas Tech; First Round	L 48–65	22–12	17 – Fertig	15 – Fertig	4 – Tied	Arena-Auditorium (2,409); Laramie, WY
*Non-conference game. ^{#}Rankings from AP poll. (#) Tournament seedings in parentheses. All times are in Mountain.
