= Julia Demirer =

Polish basketball player

Personal information
- Born: 23 October 1981 (age 45) Warszawa, Poland
- Listed height: 187 cm (6 ft 2 in)

Career information
- High school: Walkersville (Walkersville, Maryland)
- College: Emmanuel (1999–2003)
- Position: Center

Career history
- 2008–2009: Hamar
- 2010: Hamar
- 2011: Njarðvík
- 2011: Spirou Monceau
- 2013–2014: Tosyali Toyo Osmaniye
- 2016–2017: Nevsehir HCI Bektas Veli Uni
- 2016–2017: İzmit Belediyespor
- 2018–2019: Edremit Belediyesi Gürespor
- 2021–2022: Hamar-Þór

Career highlights
- 2× Úrvalsdeild rebounding leader (2009, 2010); Icelandic All-Star (2009)

Julia Demirer (born 23 October 1981) is a Polish basketball player. Following her college career with Emmanuel College, she went on to play professionally in Europe.

== College career ==
Demirer played college basketball for Emmanuel from 1999 to 2003, scoring 1,403 points.

== Club career ==
Demirer spent the 2008–2009 season with Hamar, averaging 17.3 points and 12.6 rebounds. On 29 October 2008 she scored a season high 37 points in a victory against Grindavík. In January 2010, she returned to Hamar. She helped the team to the Úrvalsdeild finals where it lost to KR.

In January 2011, Demirer signed with Njarðvík. She helped Njarðvík reach the Úrvalsdeild finals for the first time in its history where it lost to Keflavík in three games.

In September 2011, she signed with Spirou Monceau.

In 2013–2014, Demirer averaged 9.6 points and 7.9 rebounds for Tosyali Toyo Osmaniye in Turkey.

During the 2015–2016 season, she played for Nevsehir HCI Bektas Veli Uni in Turkey, averaging 8.0 points and 9.5 rebounds per game.

Demirer played for İzmit Belediyespor during the 2016–2017 season in the Turkish Women's Basketball Super League (KBSL), averaging 5.6 points and 6.2 rebounds in 37 games.

During the 2018–2019 season, she played for Edremit Belediyesi Gürespor in the Turkish Women's Basketball League where she averaged 6.0 points and 6.3 rebounds in 29 games.

In November 2021, Demirer returned to Iceland and signed with 1. deild kvenna club Hamar-Þór. In 15 regular season games, she averaged a double-double with 11.7 points and 10.9 rebounds per game, helping Hamar-Þór to a 11-9 record and a seat in the promotion playoffs.
