= Wow Air =

Icelandic low-cost airline (2012–2019)

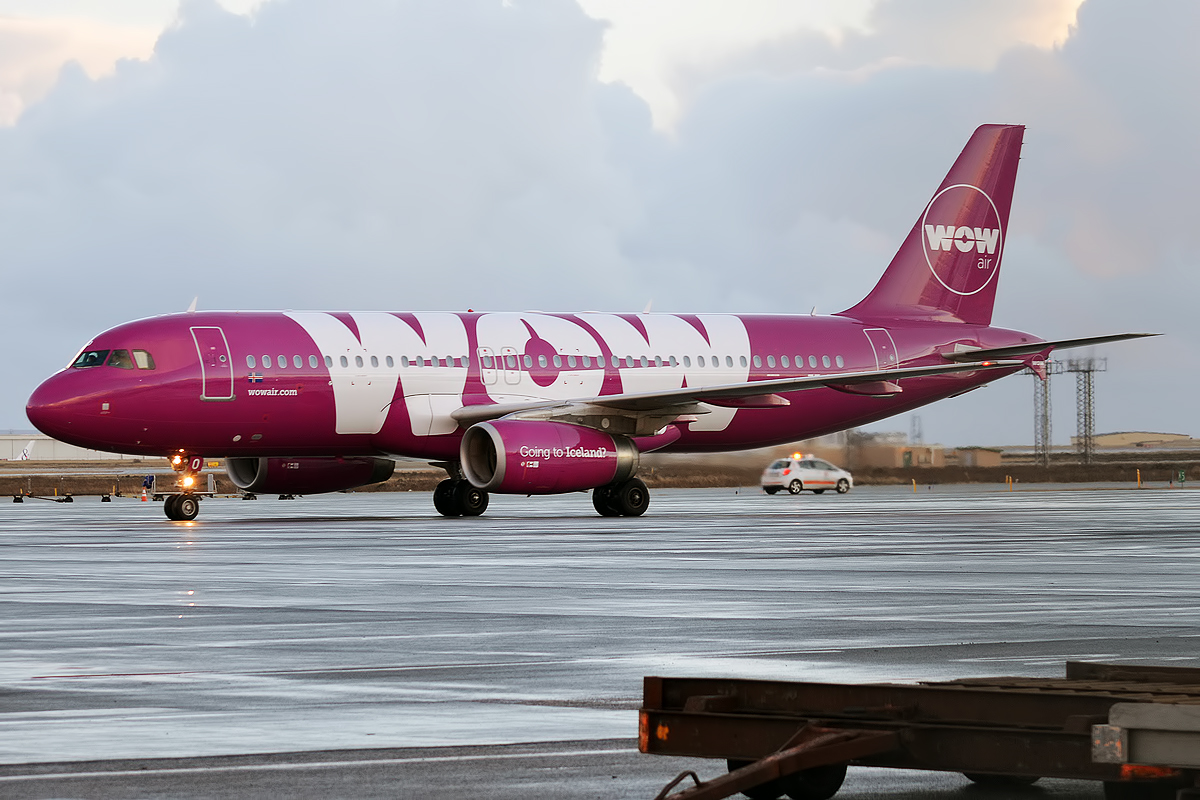
IATA	ICAO	Call sign
WW	WOW	WOW AIR
- Founded: November 2011
- Commenced operations: 31 May 2012
- Ceased operations: 28 March 2019
- Hubs: Keflavík International Airport
- Fleet size: 10
- Destinations: 27
- Key people: Skúli Mogensen (CEO and founder)
- Employees: 1,000
- Website: wowair.com

Wow Air, stylized as WOW air, was an Icelandic ultra low-cost carrier operating between 2012 and 2019. The airline was headquartered in Reykjavík and based at Keflavík International Airport. It flew between Iceland and the rest of Europe and North America, and also flew to India as part of a wider plan to expand in Asia. The airline abruptly ceased operations on 28 March 2019, when its operating company WOW air hf. went out of business.

The airline's assets were acquired by United States–based holding company USAerospace Associates, which announced in 2019 and 2020 that the airline was relaunching service; however, flights did not commence, and the media was unable to independently verify the company's statements about its business plans or find evidence of an application for an air operator's certificate.

== History ==
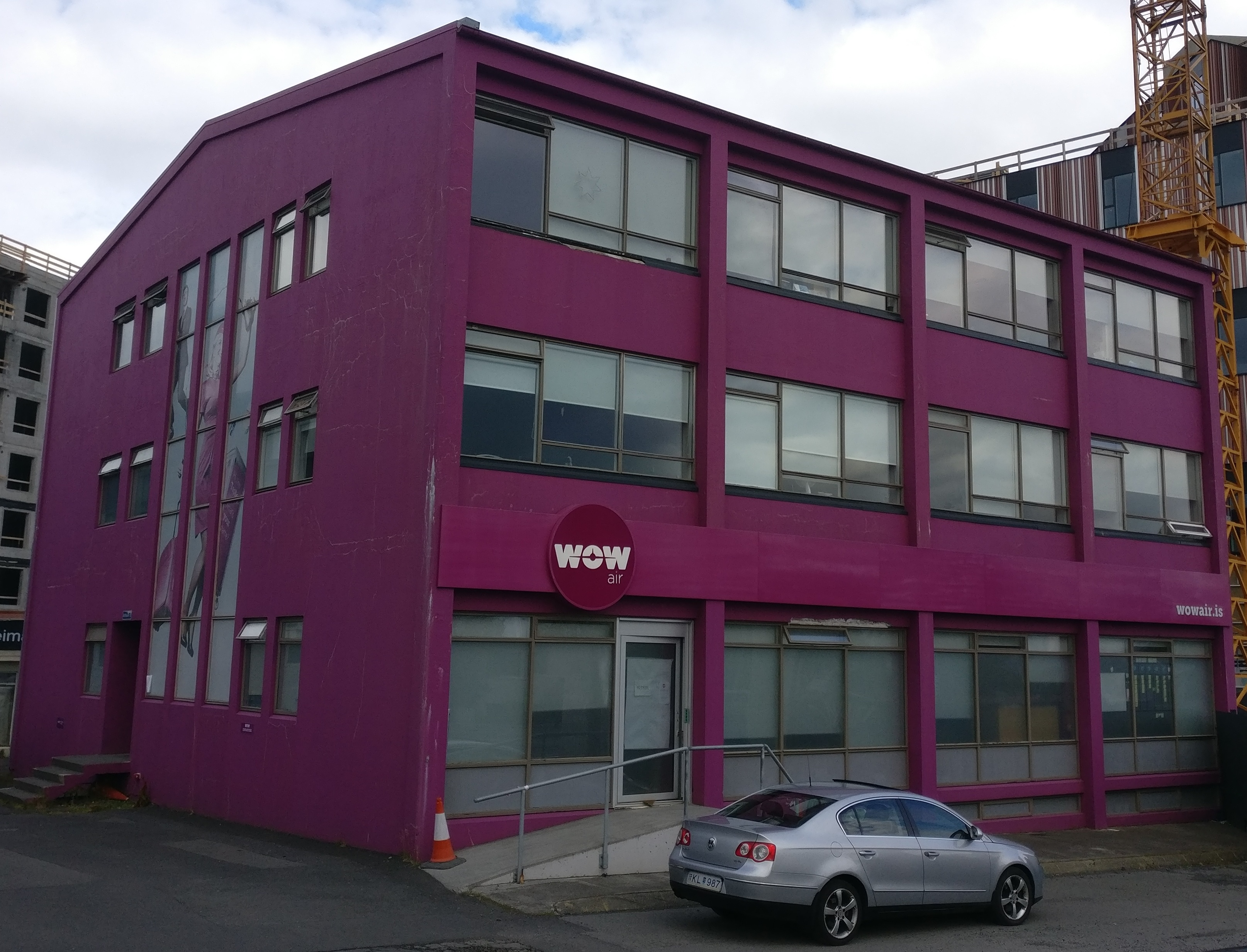
Wow Air headquarters in Reykjavík

=== Early developments and expansion (2012–2019) ===
Iceland's geographic position has made it an attractive stopover point for flights across the Atlantic. In the 1960s, flag carrier Icelandair established a stopover scheme to encourage tourism that continues to this day. Icelandic Airlines, also known as Loftleiðir and remembered by the nicknames "Hippie Airline" and "Hippie Express", also used this approach along with a number of expense-lowering measures to become the first low-cost transatlantic carrier before it merged to form Icelandair. The collapse of the króna due to the Icelandic financial crisis in 2008 and the publicity brought by the 2010 eruption of Eyjafjallajökull to its natural features led to a significant rise in tourism there.

Wow Air was founded by Icelandic entrepreneur Skúli Mogensen, who previously had an extensive business background largely in technology and telecoms in Iceland, Europe, and North America. The sole owner of Wow Air was Titan, an investment company owned by Mogensen, who was the company CEO and sat on the five-person board of directors. Mogensen cited a gap in the low-cost aviation market with regards to Iceland, and aimed to make it a major international transit point, repeatedly stating throughout that airline's history that he wanted Iceland to become "the Dubai of the north". According to him, the airline's name was chosen to signify his feelings toward Iceland and also because it reads "MOM" when the letters are turned upside down. Booking was opened 24 November 2011, with the airline planning to serve 12 destinations in Europe upon its operational launch the next summer.

The airline's first service, from Keflavík to Paris Charles de Gaulle, was flown on 31 May 2012. In October 2012, Wow Air acquired Iceland Express's operations and network. Iceland Express operated to several destinations in Europe and North America using leased equipment. At the end of October 2012, following the acquisition of its operations, flights to Gatwick and Copenhagen saw frequency increases, services to Berlin, Kaunas (which was later dropped again), Salzburg and Warsaw had begun.

The airline carried over 400,000 passengers in 2013 and reached its one millionth passenger in December 2014.

From 2015, Wow Air started expanding into North America, serving first the U.S., then Canada starting in May 2016. Flights to Los Angeles and San Francisco began in June 2016 using two Airbus A330-300 aircraft leased from Air Europa. Wow Air's annual passenger capacity more than doubled in 2016 to over 1.6 million, from approximately 740,000 in 2015.

=== Criticism of pricing claims ===
In 2017, Wow Air was accused of spreading false claims through churnalism, after several media outlets reported its claim that it would fly passengers from London Stansted to New York for £99, which it said was below cost. A flight leg priced at £99 was only available as part of a significantly more expensive return flight.

=== Peak, financial difficulties and takeover talks (2017–2018) ===
Despite a 58% increase in revenue from the past year, Wow Air experienced a loss in 2017 after two profitable years. Although a contemporary analysis from the Aviation Week Network pinned the results on overexpansion, expansion continued, with the airline reaching a high of 36 destinations in its network by 2018. Third quarter results that year showed a similar pattern, with increased revenues being counteracted by a larger loss margin. These issues were compounded by an increasing reputation for poor customer service. On 5 November 2018, it was announced that Icelandair Group, the holding company of rival carrier Icelandair, would acquire the entire share capital of Wow Air, subject to shareholder approval; the two airlines would continue to operate under separate names. Together, Icelandair and Wow Air have a share of around 3.8% of the transatlantic market. On 27 November 2018, Wow Air announced that it had returned four aircraft to their lessors as a sale and lease back offer fell through and the company's financial situation worsened due to stricter demands by suppliers and contractors. The four returned aircraft (two Airbus A320s and two A330s) are owned by the same company that was supposed to deliver four Airbus A330neos to Wow Air. On 29 November, Icelandair abandoned its takeover plans as the pre-conditions of the shareholders meeting were unlikely to be met.

The same day, Indigo Partners, which has stakes in several ultra low-cost carriers, reached a preliminary agreement to buy Wow Air. Shortly after, Wow Air announced major adjustments to its operations: the staff was reduced by 360 down to about 1,000, a further five aircraft (four Airbus A321s and the remaining A330) were to be phased out and the A330neos ordered would be cancelled. Wow Air thus ended its routes to Delhi, Los Angeles, San Francisco (which was seasonal) and Vancouver (which was to be introduced as a seasonal route in 2019). In January 2019, Wow Air disclosed that Indigo's investment would initially correspond to a 49% shareholding, with the option to increase at a later date. However, by March 2019, Indigo Partners withdrew its investment proposal and Wow Air briefly but unsuccessfully resumed talks with Icelandair Group, but after Icelandair examined WOW's finances, they quickly dismissed the proposals. On 25 March 2019, the day after talks with Icelandair ceased, several Wow Air flights were cancelled, fueling speculation as to the airline's fate. The airline attributed the cancellations to a technical failure and its knock-on effects, although two planes were immobilised after being repossessed by the lessor.

On 26 March 2019, Wow Air announced the conversion of bonds into equity and ongoing discussions with bondholders to secure the company's sustainability. The following day, the company postponed all flights scheduled for 28 March "until documentation with all parties involved have been finalised."

=== End of operations ===
On 28 March 2019, Wow Air announced that it was ceasing operations. All flights were cancelled and thousands of stranded passengers were advised to book flights with other airlines. The founder of the company, Skúli Mogensen, has spoken of a possible resurrection of the airline with a new, slow-growth business plan, if he receives the $40 million he needs. He planned to re-launch the company with five new Airbus A321neos.

Due to the market share of Wow Air on the Icelandic air travel market, the airline's bankruptcy caused some disruption in the travel plans of multiple expected visitors. The loss of flights harmed Iceland's tourism and fishing-dependent economy and caused an increase in unemployment; the airline previously delivered over one quarter of all visitors to Iceland, and its failure caused tourist visits to drop 16 percent overall and 20 percent from the United States, prompting a decline in vacation home and hotel construction.

=== Successor airlines ===
==== PLAY ====
In July 2019, former Wow Air executives announced their intention to form a new airline, tentatively named WAB air ("We Are Back"), aiming to operate six aircraft to 14 destinations across Europe and the US. In November 2019, WAB air was renamed as PLAY. In May 2021, the airline announced the registration of its air operator's certificate (AOC), as well as the acquisition of its first Airbus A321neo aircraft. The company opened routes between Iceland and seven European destinations starting on 24 June 2021. On 30 September 2025, PLAY ceased operations, citing financial difficulties.

==== Wow Air (USAerospace Associates) ====
In September 2019, USAerospace Associates announced the acquisition of Wow Air's assets and said it would start flights the next month between Washington Dulles International Airport and Keflavík using a United States AOC. However, no inaugural service date was announced, airport officials would not confirm arrangements to use airport facilities, and no application for an AOC had been filed. That October, the company said it would start passenger flights later that year, but no schedules nor destinations were announced. Later that month, an airline spokesperson said it would initially transport cargo only and would begin passenger service at an unspecified later date. In February 2020, Wow Air announced on social media that it would launch Wow Italy—part of "WOW World"—in Rome and Sicily "in the very near future".

In November 2020, RÚV interviewed USAerospace chairman Michele Roosevelt Edwards, who claimed that Wow would launch flights from Keflavík and various U.S. airports in early to mid 2021, that it was obtaining ten Airbus A321 aircraft, two of which had already been delivered and painted, and that she controlled a substantial amount of Icelandair stock; however, RÚV could not independently verify these claims, and she contradicted her 2019 statements that Wow had full financial backing. Roosevelt Edwards' lawyer in Iceland told RÚV that the airline's headquarters would be relocated to another, unspecified country, and said that the company no longer had staff in Iceland.

== Destinations ==
Before March 2019, Wow Air had operated services to a total of 20 year-round and 6 seasonal destinations in Europe, the U.S., Canada, and the Middle East from its base at Keflavík International Airport.

== Fleet ==
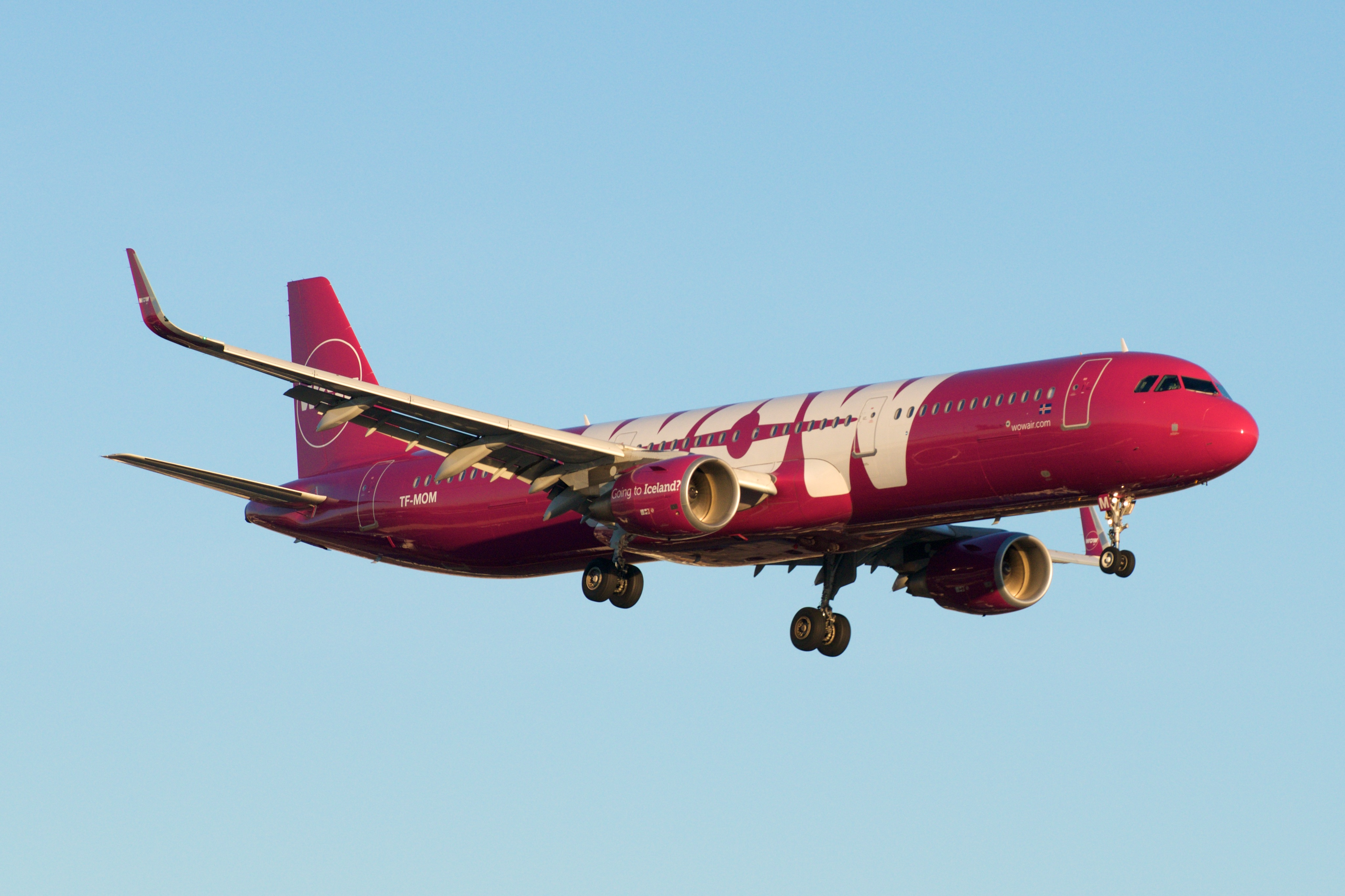
Wow Air Airbus A321-200

At the time of bankruptcy and cessation of operations on 28 March 2019, the airline operated one Airbus A320neo and four x Airbus A321-200s.

=== Previous fleet ===
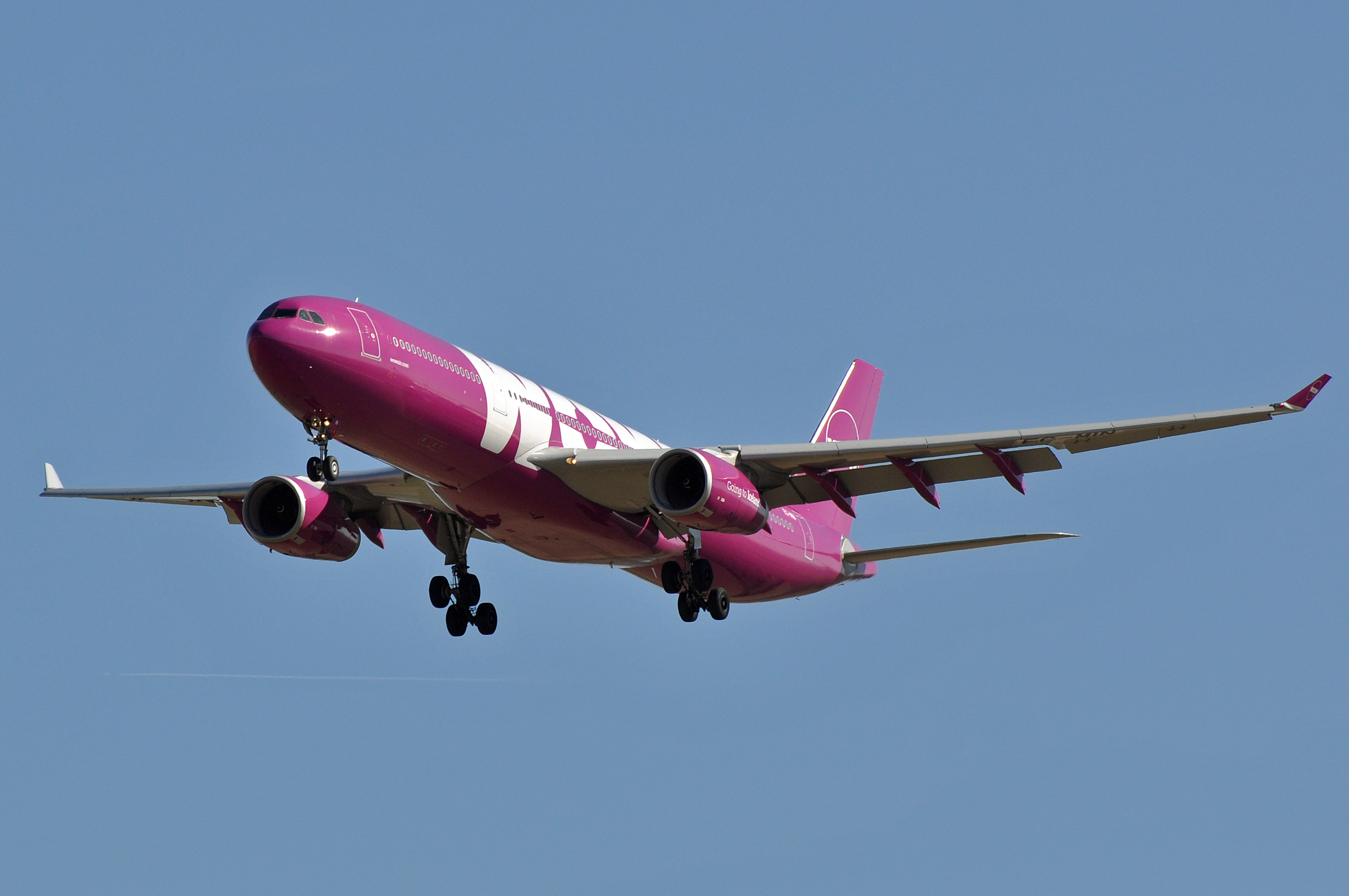
Former Wow Air Airbus A330-300

Wow Air had retired the following aircraft types prior to its shutdown:

Wow Air former fleet
Aircraft	Total	Introduced	Retired
Airbus A320-200	2	2012	2018
Airbus A320neo	1	2017	2019
Airbus A330-300	3	2016	2019

=== Fleet development ===
Wow Air's first planes were two Airbus A320-200 aircraft leased from Avion Express, both of which were nearly 20 years old when the airline started operations in 2012. In 2015, these were replaced by two newer Airbus A320-200 aircraft, while the airline also proceeded to operate the longer Airbus A321-200 aircraft, reaching a peak of twelve A321-200 aircraft by the airline's mid 2018 peak. In 2016, the airline began operating the Airbus A330-300, which it had used to launch services to the western United States, operating three of the type by mid 2018. In 2017, the airline began operating the Airbus A320neo family of aircraft, with one A320neo and two A321neo aircraft in the fleet by mid 2018. Also during 2017, the airline had ordered four Airbus A330-900 aircraft, but ultimately never took delivery of the aircraft by the time of its shutdown.

Following Wow Air's shutdown, lessors that owned Wow's fleet found new operators for the aircraft, including Air Canada Rouge and VietJet Air for its Airbus A321-200 aircraft, Onur Air for its Airbus A321neos, Turkish Airlines for its Airbus A330-300 aircraft, and Citilink and Thai AirAsia X for its undelivered Airbus A330-900 aircraft.

== See also ==
- List of defunct airlines of Iceland
