= Þór Akureyri (women's basketball) =

- Founded: 1966
- History: Þór Akureyri; 1966–present
- Arena: Höllin
- Location: Akureyri, Iceland
- Team colors: Red, White
- Championships: 3 Úrvalsdeild kvenna
- Website: thorsport.is
Home	Away

The Þór Akureyri women's basketball team, commonly known as Þór Akureyri, is the women's basketball department of Þór Akureyri multi sports club, based in the town of Akureyri in Iceland. It has won the national championship three times. During the 2023–2024 season, Þór participated in the top tier Úrvalsdeild kvenna for the first time in 45 years.

== Honors ==
- Úrvalsdeild (3):

1969, 1971, 1976

- Icelandic Basketball Cup (1):

1975

- Icelandic Basketball Super Cup (1):

2024

- Division I (1):

2017

=== Individual awards ===
- 1. deild kvenna Domestic All-First team
  - Erna Rún Magnúsdóttir - 2010
  - Fanney Lind Thomas - 2016
  - Heiða Hlín Björnsdóttir - 2018
  - Sylvía Rún Hálfdánardóttir - 2019
  - Rut Herner Konráðsdóttir - 2017, 2019
  - Unnur Lára Ásgeirsdóttir - 2017, 2018

== Notable players ==
- (Iceland) Eva Wium Elíasdóttir
- (Iceland) Fanney Lind Thomas
- (Iceland) Friðný Jóhannesdóttir
- (Iceland) Guðný Jónsdóttir
- (United States) Maddie Sutton
- (Iceland) María Guðnadóttir
- (Iceland) Sylvía Rún Hálfdánardóttir
- (Iceland) Þóra Þóroddsdóttir

== Coaches ==
- (Iceland) Einar Bollason 1968–1969
- (Iceland) Guttormur Ólafsson 1970-1971
- (Iceland) Anton Sölvason 1975-1976
- (Iceland) Tómas Hermannsson 2006-2007
- (Iceland) Bjarki Ármann Oddsson 2007–2009
- (Iceland) Baldur Ingi Jónasson 2009–2010
- (Poland) Konrad Tota 2010-2011
- (Serbia) Nebojsa Vidic 2011-2012 (u20 team)
- (United States) Mark Jones 2012-2013
- (Iceland) Ólafur Aron Ingvason 2013-2014
- (Iceland) Jón Ágúst Eyjólfsson 2014-2015
- (Iceland) Benedikt Guðmundsson 2015–2017
- (Iceland) Helgi Rúnar Bragason 2017–2019
- (Iceland) Daníel Andri Halldórsson 2021–2025
- (Spain) Lidia Mirchandani 2025–present
