= Margeir Pétursson =

Icelandic banker and chess grandmaster (born 1960)

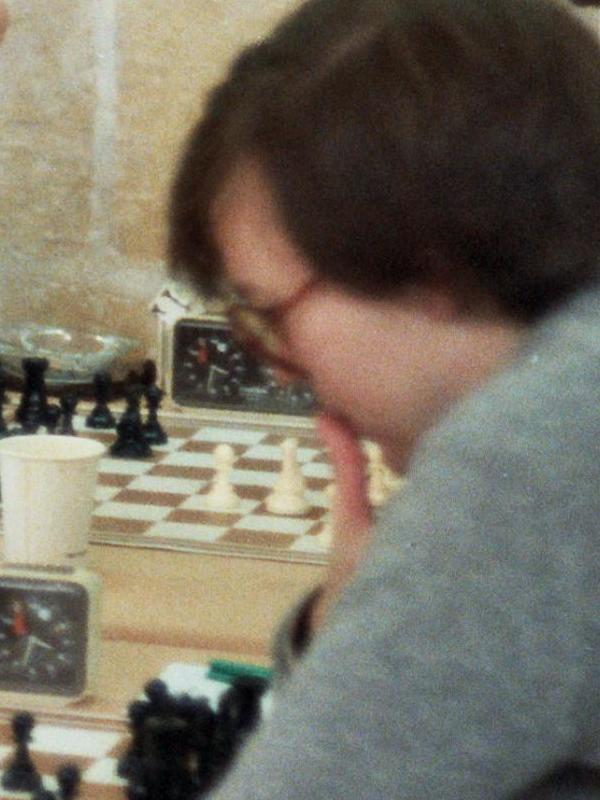
- Margeir Pétursson, 1980

Personal information
- Born: 15 February 1960 (age 66) Reykjavík, Iceland

Chess career
- Country: Iceland
- Title: Grandmaster (1986)
- Peak rating: 2585 (January 1996)
- Peak ranking: No. 33 (July 1989)

Margeir Pétursson (born 15 February 1960) is an Icelandic banker and chess grandmaster. He founded MP Bank in 1999, and has owned Bank Lviv since 2006. He was Icelandic Chess Champion in 1986 and 1987, and Nordic Chess Champion in 1987.

== Chess career ==
Born in Reykjavík on 15 February 1960, Margeir earned his international master title in 1978 and grandmaster title in 1986. He won the Hastings Premier in January 1986 with a score of 9½/13. He won the Icelandic Chess Championship in 1986 and 1987, and the Nordic Chess Championship in 1987. He competed in the July 1985 Interzonal, scoring 7/17; the 1990 Interzonal, scoring 6/13; and participated in the FIDE World Chess Championship 1998, where he was eliminated in the first round by Lembit Oll.

From 1976 to 1996, he played in eleven consecutive Chess Olympiads. His overall Olympiad score is 73/122 (+44–20=58). He also competed in two European Team Chess Championships (1992 and 2015), with an overall score of 7½/15 (+3–3=9); and one World Team Chess Championship (1993), scoring 4/7 (+2–1=4). In 2016, he participated in the 50+ group of the World Senior Team Chess Championship, scoring 6/8 (+4–0=4).

Margeir is the No. 6 ranked Icelandic player as of September 2020, with a rating of 2475.

== Business career ==
After eight years as a professional chess player, Margeir founded a securities company in 1999. This company lost money due to the dot-com crash but survived and in 2003 he converted it into an investment bank, naming it MP Bank after it obtained its commercial license. MP Bank was the only Icelandic commercial bank that did not crash during the 2008 financial crisis. It was sold to a group of Icelandic and foreign investors in 2011; as of 2015, Margeir is one of Iceland's wealthiest citizens.

In 2006, Margeir bought Bank Lviv, which is ranked 44th among the 88 Ukrainian banks in terms of assets as of October 2017. In February 2018, he acquired a 99.8% stake in the Lviv-based financial company Integral Investments.

== Personal life ==
In a 2016 interview with The Ukrainian Week, Margeir said he moved to Lviv in 2004 and has been living in the city permanently since 2011. He also stated that he is a supporter of the Icelandic Independence Party. A fluent speaker of Ukrainian, he acted as a translator for Heimir Hallgrímsson, manager of the Iceland national football team, during the Ukraine–Iceland game (that ended 1–1) held on 5 September 2016 in Kyiv.
