= Heather Ezell =

American basketball player

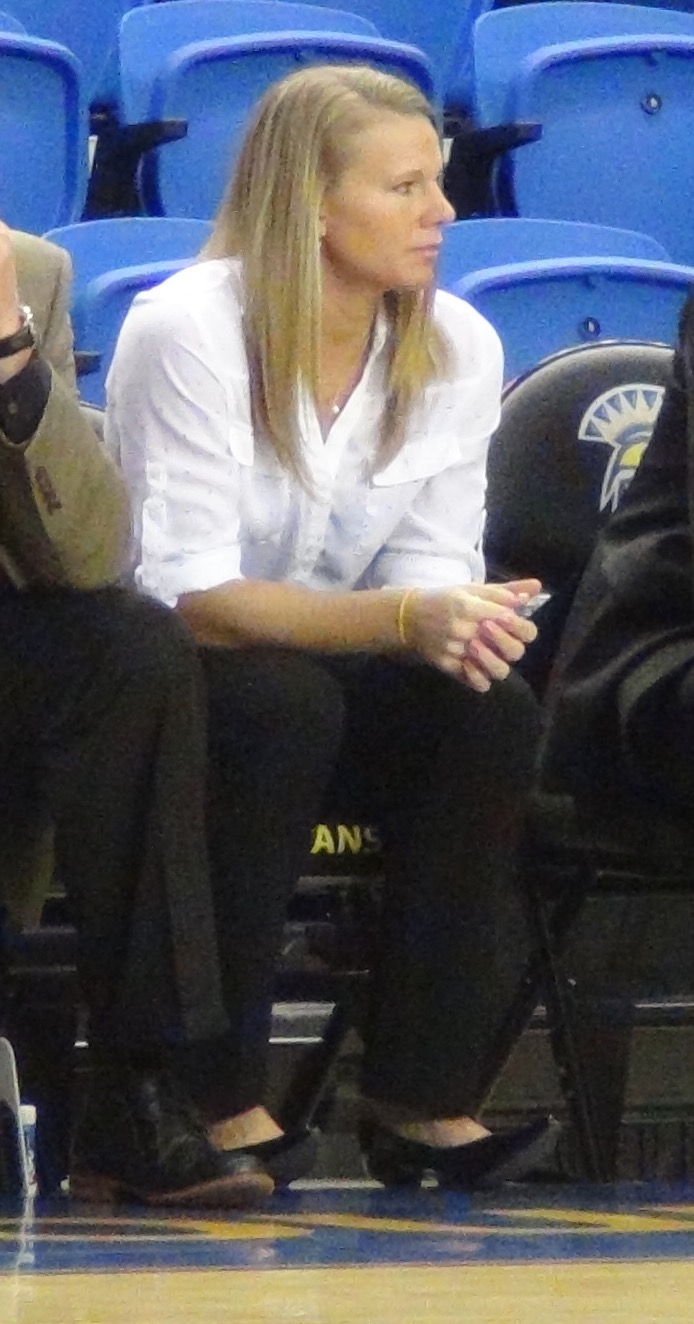
- Ezell in 2017

Wyoming Cowgirls
- Title: Head coach
- League: Mountain West Conference

Personal information
- Born: February 15, 1987 (age 39) Springfield, Missouri, U.S.
- Listed height: 177 cm (5 ft 10 in)

Career information
- High school: Kickapoo (Springfield, Missouri)
- College: Iowa State (2005–2009)
- WNBA draft: 2009: undrafted
- Playing career: 2009–2010
- Position: Guard
- Number: 10
- Coaching career: 2010–present

Career history

Playing
- 2009–2010: Haukar

Coaching
- 2010–2011: Fairfield (assistant)
- 2011–2015: Southeast Missouri State (assistant)
- 2015–2019: Wyoming (assistant)
- 2019–2022: Wyoming (associate HC)
- 2022–present: Wyoming

Career highlights
- As player: Úrvalsdeild Foreign Player of the Year (2010); Miss Show-Me Basketball (2005); Big 12 All-Tournament Team (2008); Icelandic All-Star (2009); Icelandic All-Star MVP (2009); Icelandic Cup (2010); Úrvalsdeild scoring leader (2010); Úrvalsdeild steals leader (2010)

Career Úrvalsdeild kvenna statistics
- Points: 597 (29.9 ppg)
- Rebounds: 213 (10.7 rpg)
- Assist: 597 (5.8 apg)

Heather Dawn Ezell (born February 15, 1987) is an American basketball coach and former player. She played college basketball for the Iowa State Cyclones and later professionally for Haukar in Iceland where she won multiple awards and accolades.

== Early life and college career ==
Born and raised in Springfield, Missouri, Ezell graduated from Kickapoo High School in Springfield in 2005. Despite missing most of her junior season with a knee injury, Ezell scored 1,074 points during her high school basketball career and helped Kickapoo win two state championships. As a senior in 2005, Ezell was the Missouri girls' basketball player of the year and a McDonald's High School All-American nominee.

At Iowa State University, Ezell played at guard for Iowa State Cyclones women's basketball from 2005 to 2009. She finished her career tied for the Cyclones' career record with 287 made three-point field goals and finished 10th in program history with 1,339 points. In her senior season, Ezell earned Second Team All-Big 12 honors. Ezell also earned a spot on the 2008 Big 12 All-Tournament Team and helped the Cyclones to three NCAA appearances including the Elite Eight in 2009. Ezell graduated from Iowa State in 2009 as a double major in management and marketing.

=== Iowa State statistics ===
Legend
| GP | Games played | GS | Games started | MPG | Minutes per game |
| FG% | Field goal percentage | 3P% | 3-point field goal percentage | FT% | Free throw percentage |
| RPG | Rebounds per game | APG | Assists per game | SPG | Steals per game |
| BPG | Blocks per game | PPG | Points per game | **Bold** | Career high |

| Year | Team | GP | Points | FG% | 3P% | FT% | RPG | APG | SPG | BPG | PPG |
|---|---|---|---|---|---|---|---|---|---|---|---|
| 2005–06 | Iowa State | 31 | 309 | 34.1% | 32.2% | 79.4% | **3.6** | 3.4 | 1.6 | 0.1 | 10.0 |
| 2006–07 | Iowa State | **35** | 263 | **37.6%** | 32.1% | 76.1% | 3.2 | 2.3 | 1.2 | 0.1 | 7.5 |
| 2007–08 | Iowa State | 34 | 357 | 35.8% | 33.6% | 71.4% | 3.1 | 3.1 | 1.4 | **0.3** | 10.5 |
| 2008–09 | Iowa State | **35** | **410** | 36.6% | **35.3%** | **80.4%** | 3.3 | **3.5** | **1.8** | 0.1 | **11.7** |
| Career | | 135 | 1339 | 36.0% | 33.5% | 77.1% | 3.3 | 3.1 | 1.5 | 0.2 | 9.9 |

== Professional career ==
After graduating, Ezell signed with reigning Icelandic champions Haukar prior to the 2009–2010 Úrvalsdeild season. In her first game with the team, she posted a quadruple-double with 24 points, 13 rebounds, 10 assists and 10 steals in a victory against Njarðvík in the Icelandic Company Cup. In December 2009, she was selected to the Icelandic All-Star game where she was named MVP after posting 29 points, 13 rebounds and 10 assists in her team's victory. In January 2010, she was named as one of the five best players of the first half of the season. On 9 January 2010, Ezell again achieved a quadruple-double when she posted 25 points, 15 rebounds, 11 assists and 10 steals in a victory against Valur. Four days later, she scored a season high 40 points while also contributing 10 rebounds and 13 assists in a victory against Njarðvík.

On 17 January, she helped Haukar to the semi-finals of the Icelandic Cup after posting 23 points, 15 rebounds and 10 assists in a victory against Snæfell. On 31 January, she led Haukar to the Cup finals after posting 16 points, 10 rebounds and 7 assists in a victory against Njarðvík in the semi-finals. In the Cup Finals, Haukar faced Keflavík, led by former University of Iowa rival Kristi Smith In the game, Haukar came out victorious with Ezell posting the first triple-double in the Cup finals history with 25 points, 15 rebounds and 11 assists.

In the Úrvalsdeild, Ezell led all players in scoring during the regular season, averaging 29.9 points per game and was named the best player of the second half of the season. On 8 March, she led Haukar to the Úrvalsdeild semi-finals after scoring 19 points in the series clinching game against Grindavík in the first round of the playoffs. In the semi-finals, Haukar where swept by eventual champions KR. After the season, Ezell was named as the Úrvalsdeild Foreign Player of the Year.

The following season, Ezell retired from playing basketball and went into coaching.

== Coaching career ==
On March 25, 2022, Ezell was named as the head coach of University of Wyoming women's basketball team.

== Head coaching record ==
Record table
| Season | Team | Overall | Conference | Standing | Postseason |
|---|---|---|---|---|---|
Wyoming Cowgirls (Mountain West Conference) (2022–present)
| 2022–23 | Wyoming | 23–11 | 13–5 | 2nd | WNIT Second Round |
| 2023–24 | Wyoming | 18–15 | 11–7 | 3rd | WNIT Great 8 |
| 2024-25 | Wyoming | 22–12 | 14–4 | 2nd | WBIT First Round |
| 2025-26 | Wyoming | 10–20 | 7–13 | 8th | |
| Wyoming: | | 73–58 (.557) | 45–32 (.584) | | |
| Total: | | 73–58 (.557) | | | |
National champion Postseason invitational champion Conference regular season champion Conference regular season and conference tournament champion Division regular season champion Division regular season and conference tournament champion Conference tournament champion

== National team career ==
Ezell played for the United States national team at the 2006 William Jones Cup where she averaged 8.7 points and two assists per game.
