= Astraeus Airlines =

British airline

Astraeus
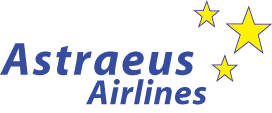

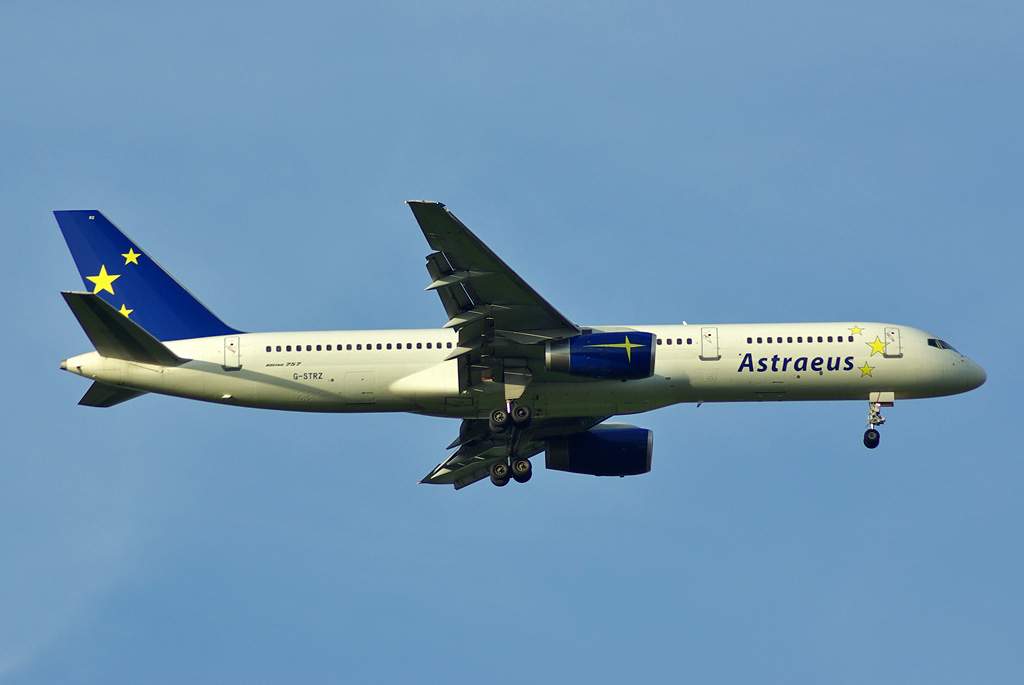
- Boeing 757-200
IATA	ICAO	Call sign
5W	AEU	FLYSTAR
- Founded: 2001
- Commenced operations: 2002
- Ceased operations: 21 November 2011
- Operating bases: Gatwick Airport
- Fleet size: 9
- Parent company: Fengur
- Headquarters: Crawley, United Kingdom
- Key people: Steve Clarke, Palli Borg, Daryl Deacon, Bruce Dickinson, Phil Rushton

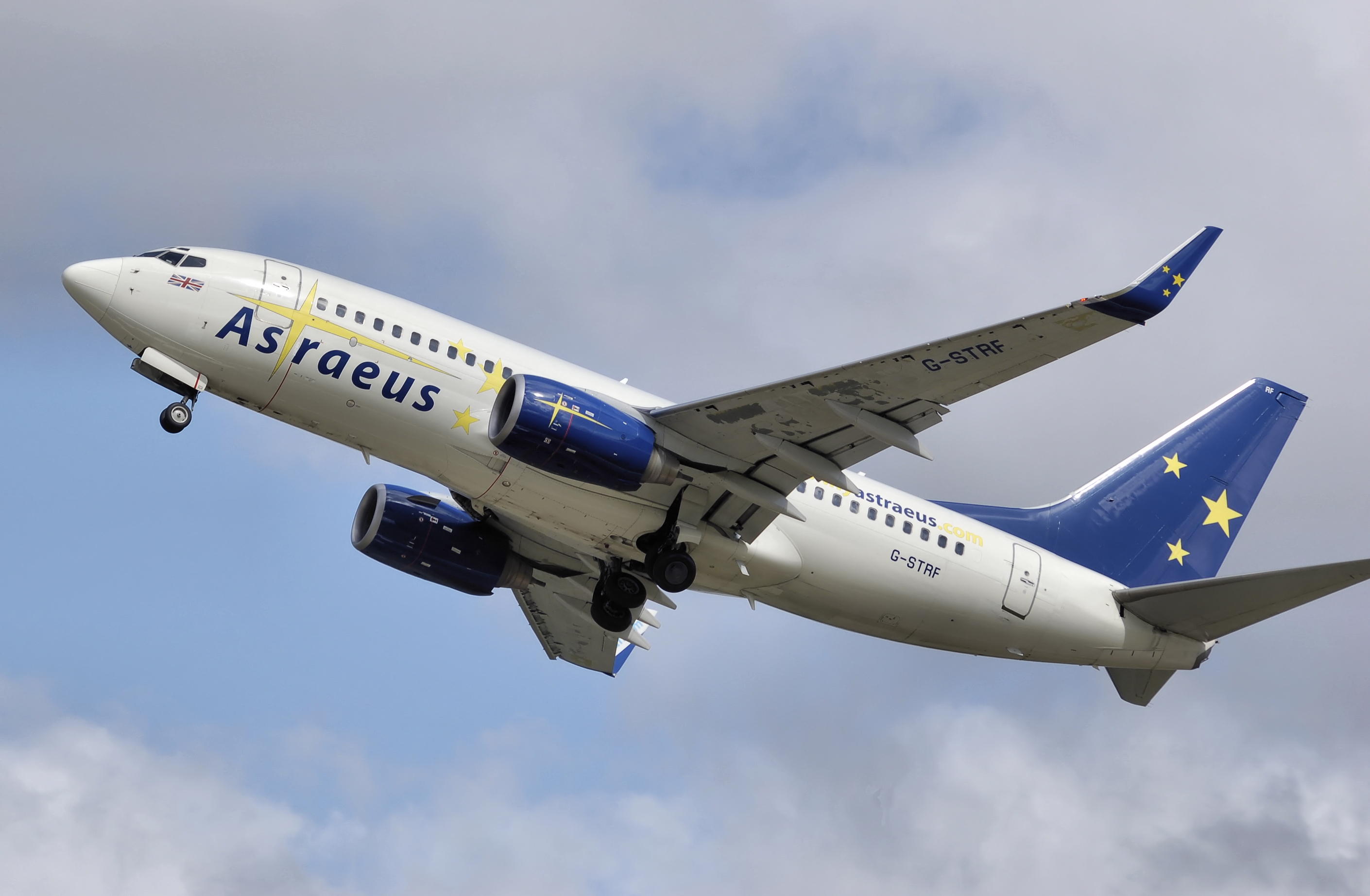
Boeing 737-700 (2008)

Astraeus Limited, trading as Astraeus Airlines, was a British airline based at Astraeus House in Crawley, West Sussex, England. Founded in January 2001, and named after the Greek God of the dusk, it entered administration on 21 November 2011, ceasing operations the same day.

Established as a charter airline, Astraeus changed its business model in May 2008 and ceased full-time charter and scheduled service flying to concentrate on sublease activities. Astraeus provided aircraft anywhere in the world to meet short and long-term lease requirements, with wet lease, damp lease or dry lease options. The main base was London Gatwick Airport.

Astraeus Airlines also had a history of providing ad hoc capacity to various clients. This included sports charters (Manchester United, Arsenal, UK and Irish FA and many others), military charters, show business charters (Disney, Warner Bros.), various government contracts and general charters for the leisure and business industry.

Astraeus Limited held a United Kingdom Civil Aviation Authority Type A Operating Licence and was therefore permitted to carry passengers, cargo and mail on aircraft with 20 or more seats. Astraeus Airlines was an IOSA registered company with the International Air Transport Association.

== History ==
Astraeus Airlines commenced charter operations in April 2002 with Boeing 737 aircraft and also operated under the Flystar brand for a short time. After establishing itself as a reliable charter carrier to UK leisure tour operators for both summer and winter seasons, the fleet was extended in 2004 to include Boeing 757 aircraft. By 2008 the fleet had grown to two Boeing 737-300s, two Boeing 737-700s and five Boeing 757-200s.

As of 2009, Astraeus Airlines was the only airline charter company which remained based at Gatwick Airport, and grew its fleet, adding a Boeing 737-500 and 737-700.

Astraeus was a 100%-owned subsidiary of Eignarhaldsfelagid Fengur hf, an Icelandic-based travel group that also owned the Iceland Express airline.

Astraeus ended operations on 21 November 2011 and entered administration. The airline cited a lack of contracts for the winter of 2011 and some "extremely bad luck" with technical issues as reasons for ending operations.

== Fleet ==
In November 2011, the Astraeus fleet consisted of the following aircraft with an average age of 17.4 years:

Astraeus fleet
Aircraft	In services	Passengers	Notes
Airbus A320-200	1	180	
Boeing 737-500	1	126	
Boeing 737-700	2	148	
Boeing 757-200	5	160-221	
Total	9		

== Astraeus and Iron Maiden ==
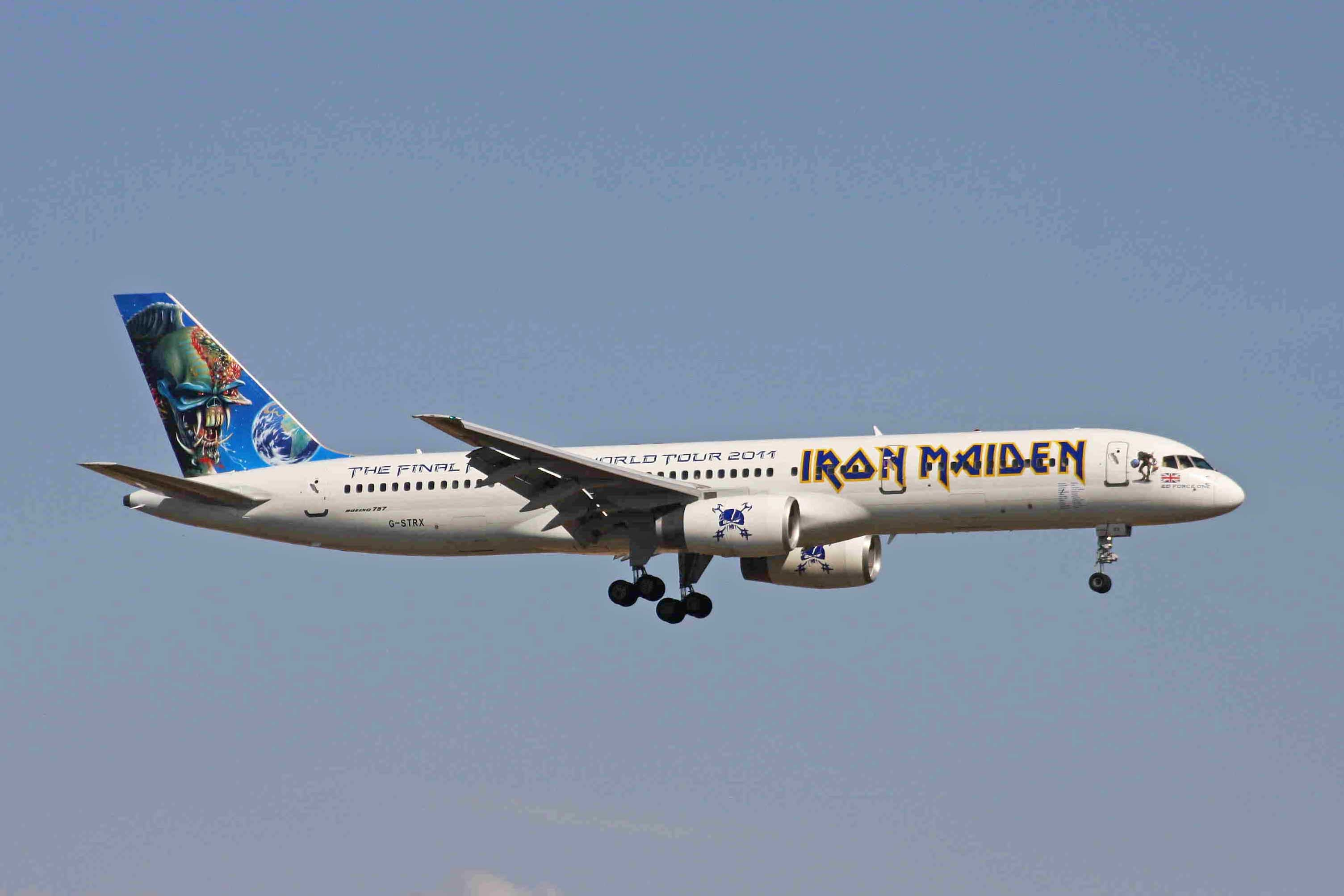
Boeing 757-200 G-STRX as "Ed Force One" in May 2011.

Bruce Dickinson, lead singer of heavy metal band Iron Maiden, was a captain for Astraeus, flying the Boeing 757 aircraft when not performing with the band. Dickinson was also Astraeus's marketing director. Dickinson has flown many high-profile flights for Astraeus: for example, on 20 October 2010, he flew the Liverpool F.C. team to Naples, Italy, for their European Cup match against Napoli.

Iron Maiden commissioned an Astraeus 757 as transport for their Somewhere Back in Time tour in 2008 and nicknamed it Ed Force One, flown by the lead singer Dickinson himself. The aircraft was converted into a combi configuration, repainted with an Iron Maiden livery and was used in this scheme until 28 May 2008. The same aircraft (G-OJIB) was used again on the second leg of the Somewhere Back in Time tour in 2009. The aircraft was also meant to be used for The Final Frontier World Tour in 2011; however on 8 February 2011 another 757-200 aircraft (G-STRX) departed Southend with a sightly differing Iron Maiden livery for the tour.

== See also ==
- List of defunct airlines of the United Kingdom
