= Icelandic Basketball Association Women's All-Star Game =

- Status: Inactive
- Years active: 2004–2014
- Inaugurated: 14 January 2004
- Most recent: 25 January 2014
- Organizer: Icelandic Basketball Association

The Icelandic Basketball Association Women's All-Star Game was a basketball exhibition game hosted by the Icelandic Basketball Association (KKÍ). It was held was held annually from 2004 to 2014 and featured a mix of the countries star players. The first annual All-Star Game was played at the Seljaskóli Stadium on 14 January 2004. It was last held on 24 January 2014 at the Ásvellir stadium.

The teams selections varied from year to year, with sports journalists selecting the teams during the first years while later teams were selected by fans and coaches. The teams buildup also varied, sometimes splitting the players to teams based on geography (Players from Suðurnes or the Capital Region versus the rest of the country) or pitting domestic players against foreign players.

The All-Star day also featured a three-point contest and a celebrity game.

== All-Star Game results ==
14 January 2004
20:00

Boxscore

Team Reykjavík	78–99	Team Suðurnes
Scoring by quarter: 18–28, 29–17, 12–33, 19–21
Pts: Brooks 16; Rebs: Hildur 10; Asts: Alda Leif, Hildur, Wolfe 7		Pts: Birna 17; Rebs: Erla Þ., Anna María 8 Asts: Erla R. 8

Seljaskóli, Reykjavík

15 January 2005
14.10

Boxscore

Team Iceland	62–83	Team Select
Scoring by quarter: 17–18, 12–11, 15–20, 18–24
Pts: Birna 10; Rebs: Erla Þ., María Ben 7 Asts: Svava Ósk, Rannveig 3		Pts: Shaw 22; Rebs: Woudstra 11; Asts: Janjic 5

Valsheimilið, Reykjavík
Referees: Eggert Þór Aðalsteinsson, Halldór Geir Jensson

14 January 2006
13:30

Boxscore

Team Iceland	77–98	Team Select
Scoring by quarter: 18–26, 27–27, 17–18, 15–27
Pts: Helena 21; Rebs: Helena 8 Asts: Helena 6		Pts: Barkus 23; Rebs: Barkus, Mahoney, Hoffman 9 Asts: Barkus, Mahoney 6

DHL Höllin, Reykjavík
Referees: Björgvin Rúnarsson, Lárus Ingi Magnússon

13 January 2007
14:00

Boxscore

Team Iceland Express	76–112	Team Shell
Scoring by quarter: 18–22, 15–33, 26–24, 17–33
Pts: Bowie 12		Pts: Okonkwo 23

DHL Höllin, Reykjavík
Referees: Guðni Eiríkur Guðmundsson, Jóhann Gunnar Guðmundsson

19 January 2008
13:30

Boxscore

Team Iceland	78–100	Team Iceland Express
Scoring by quarter: 15–24, 20–25, 23–27, 20–24
Pts: Signý 17; Rebs: Signý 12; Asts: Hildur 6		Pts: Martin 28; Rebs: Roberson 14; Asts: Roberson 10

Keflavík
Referees: Jóhann Gunnar Guðmundsson, Georgía Olga Kristiansen

13 December 2008
13:30

Boxscore

Team Iceland	94–103	Team Iceland Express
Scoring by quarter: 22–26, 30–37, 18–21, 24–19
Pts: Birna 27; Rebs: Sigrún Sjöfn 11; Asts: Pálína 8		Pts: Barkus 32; Rebs: Demirer 14; Asts: Bowman 9

Ásvellir, Hafnarfjörður
Referees: Davíð Tómas Tómasson, Jón Guðmundsson

12 December 2009
13:00

Boxscore

Team Iceland Express	103–85	Team Shell
Scoring by quarter: 30–14, 21–16, 20–22, 32–33
Pts: DeVault 32; Rebs: Ezell 13; Asts: Ezell 10		Pts: Moss 22; Rebs: Moss 11; Asts: Schram, Smith 5

Dalhús, Reykjavík
Referees: Georgía Olga Kristiansen, Steinar Orri Sigurðsson

15 January 2011
15:15

Boxscore

Team Landsbyggð	110–112	Team Reykjanes
Scoring by quarter: 18–40, 32–19, 31–24, 29–29
Pts: Harris, Butler 20; Rebs: Butler 8 Asts: Harris 8		Pts: Boyd 28; Rebs: Adamshick 11; Asts: Adamshick 11

Ásgarður, Garðabær
Referees: Davíð Tómas Tómasson

30 January 2013
19:30

Boxscore

Team Capital Area	106–109 (OT)	Team Landsbyggðin
Scoring by quarter: 16–25, 23–23, 31–27, 26–21, Overtime: 10–13
Pts: Jones 29; Rebs: Evans 15; Asts: McCallum 6		Pts: Hardy, Smith 20; Rebs: Hardy 18; Asts: Hardy 10

Blue-Höllin, Keflavík

25 January 2014
13:00

Boxscore

Team Domino's	86–85	Team Icelandair
Scoring by quarter: 28–23, 22–25, 13–13, 23–24
Pts: Brown 23; Rebs: Marín 9 Asts: Hildur 8		Pts: Sigrún Sjöfn 16; Rebs: Henry 7 Asts: Landry 7

Ásvellir, Hafnarfjörður
Referees: Jakob Árni Ísleifsson, Gunnar Þór Andrésson

== All-Star Game MVP ==
Year	Player	Nationality	Team
2003-04	Erla Þorsteinsdóttir	ISL	Keflavík
2004-05	Vera Janjic	SER	Njarðvík
2005-06	Megan Mahoney	USA	Haukar
2006-07	Ifeoma Okonkwo	USA	Haukar
2007-08	Monique Martin	USA	KR
2008-09	LaKiste Barkus	USA	Hamar
2009-10	Heather Ezell	USA	Haukar
2010-11	Jacquline Adamshick	USA	Keflavík
2011-12	Not played		
2012-13	Lele Hardy	USA	Njarðvík
2013-14	Chynna Brown	USA	Snæfell

== See also ==
- Icelandic Basketball Association Men's All-Star Game

== Sources ==
- All editions
