= BritishJET =

Travel and holiday companies of the United Kingdom

| IATA | ICAO | Call sign |
|---|---|---|
| - | - | FLYHELLO |
- Founded: 2004
- Ceased operations: 2008
- Fleet size: 1
- Destinations: 13
- Headquarters: Malta
- Key people: Robbie Borg (Founder)
- Website: www.britishjet.com

BritishJET was a trading name for the tour operator Malta Bargains Limited based in Malta. It operated inclusive tour charter flights from Malta International Airport. The company held a United Kingdom Civil Aviation Authority (CAA) Air Travel Organiser's Licence (ATOL2077).

== History ==
The operation was established on 29 September 2004, when Malta Bargains Limited (previously Malta Sun Holidays) a travel agent specialising in Maltese holidays for British tourists, was licensed by the UK CAA as a tour operator. Services started with a flight between London Gatwick and Malta on 1 May 2005 and then to other UK airports. In 2008 BritishJET ceased operations as their contract with Malta Bargains ended. Air Malta became Malta Bargains' carrier of passengers between the UK and Malta.

== Destinations ==
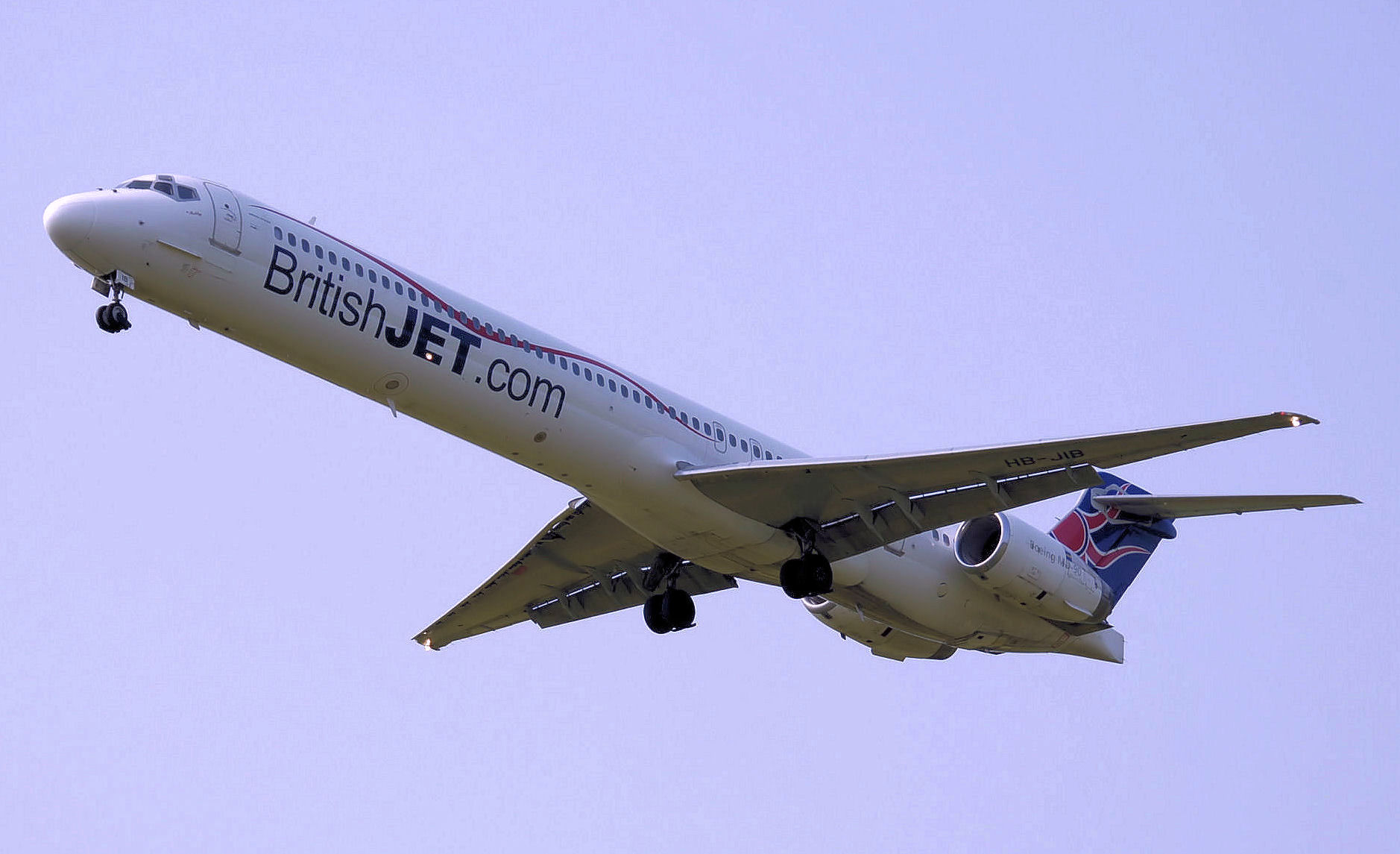
The sole BritishJET McDonnell Douglas MD-90-30 landing at Gatwick Airport in 2007

BritishJET served the following destinations:

Malta

- Luqa (Malta International Airport) Base

United Kingdom

- Birmingham (Birmingham Airport)
- Bristol (Bristol Airport)
- Cardiff (Cardiff Airport)
- East Midlands (East Midlands Airport)
- Exeter (Exeter Airport)
- Glasgow (Glasgow Airport)
- Leeds/Bradford (Leeds Bradford Airport)
- London
  - (Gatwick Airport)
  - (Stansted Airport)
- Manchester (Manchester Airport)
- Newcastle upon Tyne (Newcastle Airport)
- Norwich (Norwich Airport)

== Fleet ==
The BritishJET fleet consisted of the following aircraft (at March 2007):

- 1 McDonnell Douglas MD-90-30 (leased from Hello)
