= MP Bank =

Investment bank in Iceland

MP banki hf.
- Company type: Private
- Industry: Banking
- Founded: October 15, 2003
- Defunct: June 30, 2015
- Successor: Kvika banki
- Headquarters: Reykjavík, Iceland

MP banki was an investment bank in Iceland that operated from 2003 until 2015 when it became part of Kvika Banki.

== History ==
The company was founded as MP Securities (Icelandic: MP Verðbréf hf) in 1999 by Margeir Pétursson together with Sverrir Kristinsson and Ágústi Sindra Karlsson. They owned 10% each, while Margeir 80% shares.

The bank received an investment banking license in 2003 and started to offered a comprehensive investment banking service. After the bank was licensed as an investment bank the name changed to MP Investment Bank (Icelandic: MP Fjárfestingarbanki hf).

In 2008, the bank received a commercial banking license and changed its name to MP banki. It became the only commercial bank in Iceland that did not collapse due to the 2008 financial crisis.

MP banki and Straumur Investment Bank merged in July 2015 and the name changed to Kvika banki.
