= Skúlason =

Skúlason is a surname of Icelandic origin, meaning son of Skúli. In Icelandic names, the name is not strictly a surname, but is a patronymic. The name may refer to:

- Ari Freyr Skúlason (born 1987), Icelandic professional football player
- Einarr Skúlason (fl. 12th century), Icelandic priest and skald
- Ólafur Ingi Skúlason (born 1983), Icelandic professional football player
- Páll Skúlason (born 1945), Icelandic professor of philosophy; rector of the University of Iceland
