= Iceland Express =

Icelandic low-cost airline (2002–2012)

Coordinates: 64.13764°N 21.883714°W

IATA	ICAO	Call sign
HC	—	FLY STAR
- Founded: 2002
- Ceased operations: 2012
- Hubs: Keflavík International Airport
- Fleet size: 1
- Destinations: 17
- Parent company: Fengur
- Headquarters: Reykjavík, Iceland
- Key people: Skarphéðinn Berg Steinarsson, Managing Director
- Website: icelandexpress.com

Iceland Express was a low-fare airline headquartered in Reykjavík, Iceland that was acquired by WOW air. It operated services to several destinations in Europe using wet-leased aircraft. Its main base was Keflavík International Airport.

== History ==
The airline was established in 2002 and began operations on 27 February 2003. This contract was taken over by JetX Airlines and then by Hello. In the Autumn of 2008, Astraeus Airlines resumed operating all flights on behalf of Iceland Express with two Boeing 737-700 aircraft.

The airline was owned by Icelandic investment group, Northern Travel Holding. Northern Travel Holding was acquired in full by Fons in September 2008. It silently changed hands to sister company Fengur before the bankruptcy of Fons. Fons was established by the two main owners of Fengur.

Fengur acquired 100% of Astraeus Airlines. The company started trans-Atlantic flights to Newark Liberty International Airport, four times a week and Winnipeg James Armstrong Richardson International Airport, two times a week, in June 2010, with a mix of 737s and two Boeing 757s operated by Astraeus. In late summer 2010, the airline published its winter schedule with the Newark flights year-round, as well as seasonal destinations such as Orlando.

The airline announced that it would fly to Chicago, Boston, Miami, Belfast and Orlando in June 2011, although the Belfast and Miami services never eventuated. As of 2012 though, the airline did not offer flights to or from the United States.

On 21 November 2011, Astraeus, the sole operator of all Iceland Express flights, suddenly ceased operations with immediate effect. As a result, Iceland Express began leasing two Airbus A320s from Holidays Czech Airlines, a Czech Airlines subsidiary.

On 24 October 2012, WOW air acquired Iceland Express' operations and network.

== Fleet ==
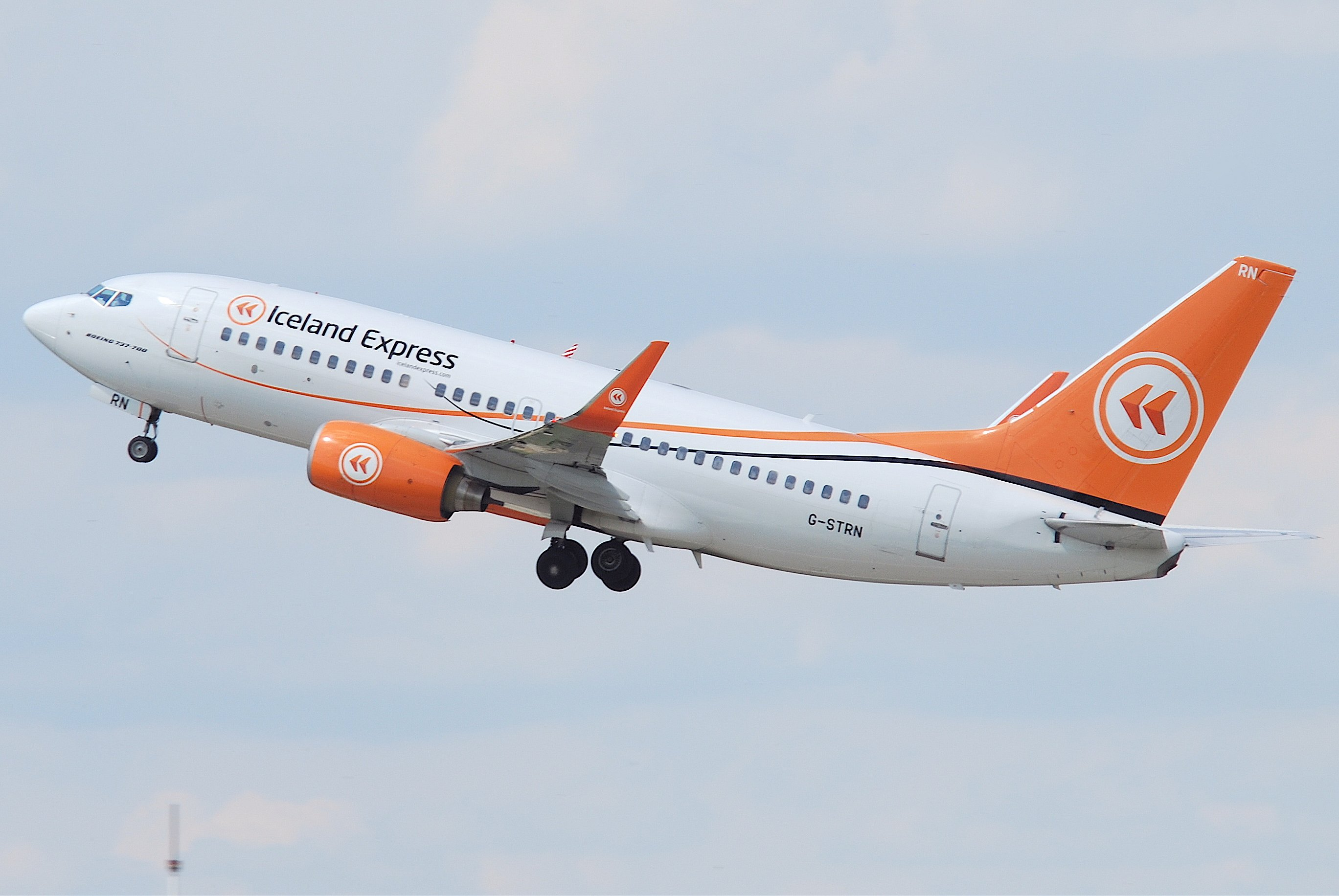
Iceland Express Boeing 737-700 operated by Astraeus Airlines

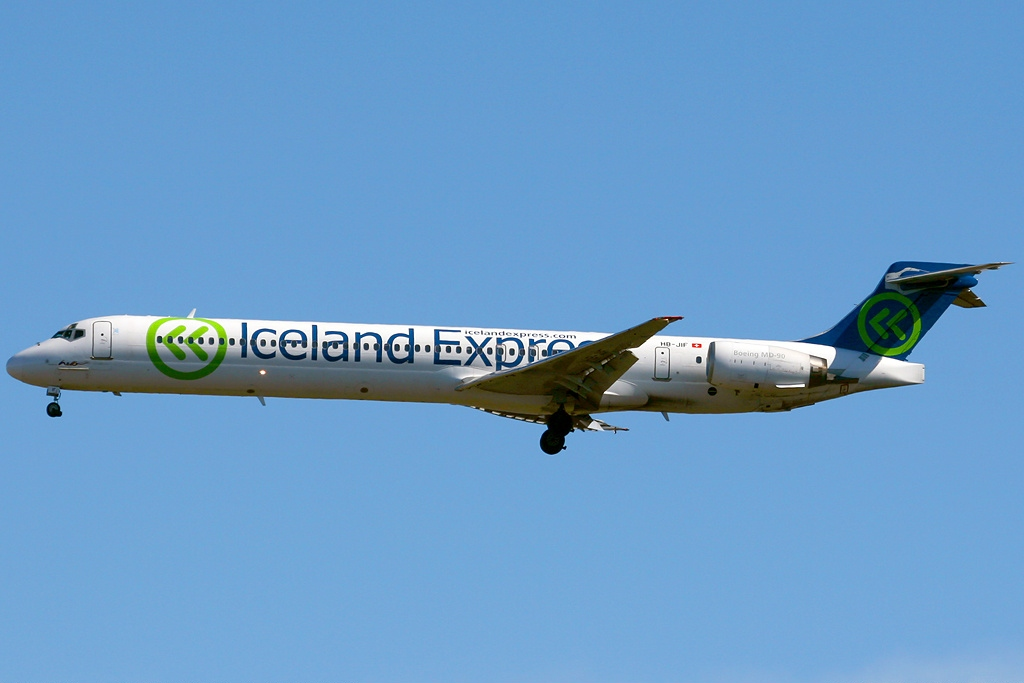
Iceland Express McDonnell Douglas MD-90 operated by Hello

=== Final fleet ===
As of November 2011, Iceland Express operated the following aircraft:

Aircraft	Total	Passengers	Notes
Airbus A320-200	1	180	operated by Holidays Czech Airlines
Total	1		

=== Historic fleet ===
Iceland Express formerly also operated the following aircraft:

- 2 Boeing 737-300 (leased from Astraeus Airlines)
- 1 Boeing 737-500 (leased from Astraeus Airlines)
- 2 Boeing 737-700 (leased from Astraeus Airlines)
- 4 Boeing 757-200 (leased from Astraeus Airlines)
- 2 McDonnell Douglas MD-83 (leased from JetX)
- 3 McDonnell Douglas MD-90 (leased from Hello)
