= DataMarket =

- Company type: Private
- Founded: Reykjavík, Iceland; 2008; 18 years ago
- Founder: Hjálmar Gíslason
- Defunct: 2020; 6 years ago
- Headquarters: Reykjavík, Iceland
- Area served: Worldwide
- Key people: Hjálmar Gíslason, Gunnlaugur Briem
- Services: data visualization
- Owner: Qlik
- Number of employees: 7
- Website: datamarket.com

DataMarket was a privately held Icelandic company that specialises in providing access to and visually displaying data from public and, to a lesser extent, private institutions and companies. DataMarket was established in Reykjavík, the capital of Iceland in 2008. The Guardian Technology blog labeled DataMarket as being "Impressive, and interesting".

One of DataMarkets contracts was to graphically visualize the 2011 budget for Reykjavík municipality. DataMarket has gotten wide media coverage in Iceland.

Initially DataMarket focused on the Icelandic market by incorporating data from various public institutions such as Statistics Iceland, the Central Bank of Iceland, the Icelandic Directorate of Labour, the Icelandic Marine Research Institute, National Energy Authority of Iceland, Registers Iceland, the Report of the Althingi Special Investigation Commission and the private Icelandic consultancy firm Capacent to name a few.

Shortly later it branched out and DataMarket now provides access to international data from Eurostat, United Nations Statistics Division, The World Bank and the Gapminder Foundation.

DataMarket won two awards at the annual 2011 Icelandic Web Awards, awarded by the non-profit Iceland web industry association, one for the most interesting web and one for the best service and information web.

In 2014, DataMarket was acquired by Qlik.

In 2020, DataMarket was retired by Qlik.
