= Hello (airline) =

Charter airline of Switzerland (2003–2012)

Hello AG
IATA	ICAO	Call sign
HW	FHE	FLYHELLO
- Founded: 2003
- Commenced operations: 6 August 2004
- Ceased operations: 21 October 2012
- Operating bases: Basel/Mulhouse; Zürich
- Parent company: Hello AG
- Headquarters: EuroAirport Basel Mulhouse Freiburg; Saint-Louis, Haut-Rhin, France
- Key people: Robert Somers (CEO)
- Founder: Moritz Suter
- Website: hello.ch

Hello AG was a Swiss charter airline offering holiday flights to destinations around the Mediterranean Sea out of EuroAirport Basel Mulhouse Freiburg, Geneva Airport and Zürich Airport.

The airline's head office was on the property of EuroAirport.

== History ==
The airline was established in 2003 in Basel by Moritz Suter, who founded Crossair which later became Swiss International Air Lines in 2002, and launched operations on 6 August 2004. Originally being intended as a regional scheduled carrier, it was relaunched on 1 May 2005 as a charter airline. In December 2011, the company had 140 employees. The airline's head office was located at the General Aviation site at the EuroAirport Basel Mulhouse Freiburg in Saint-Louis, Haut-Rhin, France, near Basel.

The airline went bankrupt and ceased all flight operations on 21 October 2012.

== Destinations ==
=== Africa ===
==== Cape Verde ====
- Boa Vista: Rabil Airport
- Sal: Amílcar Cabral International Airport

==== Egypt ====
- Hurghada: Hurghada International Airport
- Luxor: Luxor International Airport
- Marsa Alam: Marsa Alam International Airport
- Sharm el-Sheikh: Sharm el-Sheikh International Airport

==== Morocco ====
- Agadir: Al Massira Airport
- Marrakesh: Marrakesh Menara Airport

=== Europe ===
==== Cyprus ====
- Larnaca: Larnaca International Airport

==== Greece ====
- Corfu: Corfu International Airport
- Heraklion: Heraklion International Airport
- Kefalonia: Kefalonia Island International Airport
- Kos: Kos Island International Airport
- Rhodes: Rhodes International Airport
- Zakynthos: Zakynthos International Airport

==== North Macedonia ====
- Ohrid: Ohrid Airport
- Skopje: Skopje Alexander the Great Airport

==== Portugal ====
- Funchal: Madeira Airport

==== Spain ====
- La Palma: La Palma Airport
- Mallorca: Palma de Mallorca Airport
- Tenerife: Tenerife South Airport

==== Switzerland ====
- Basel: EuroAirport Basel Mulhouse Freiburg Main Base
- Zurich: Zurich Airport Base

==== Turkey ====
- Antalya: Antalya Airport

== Fleet ==
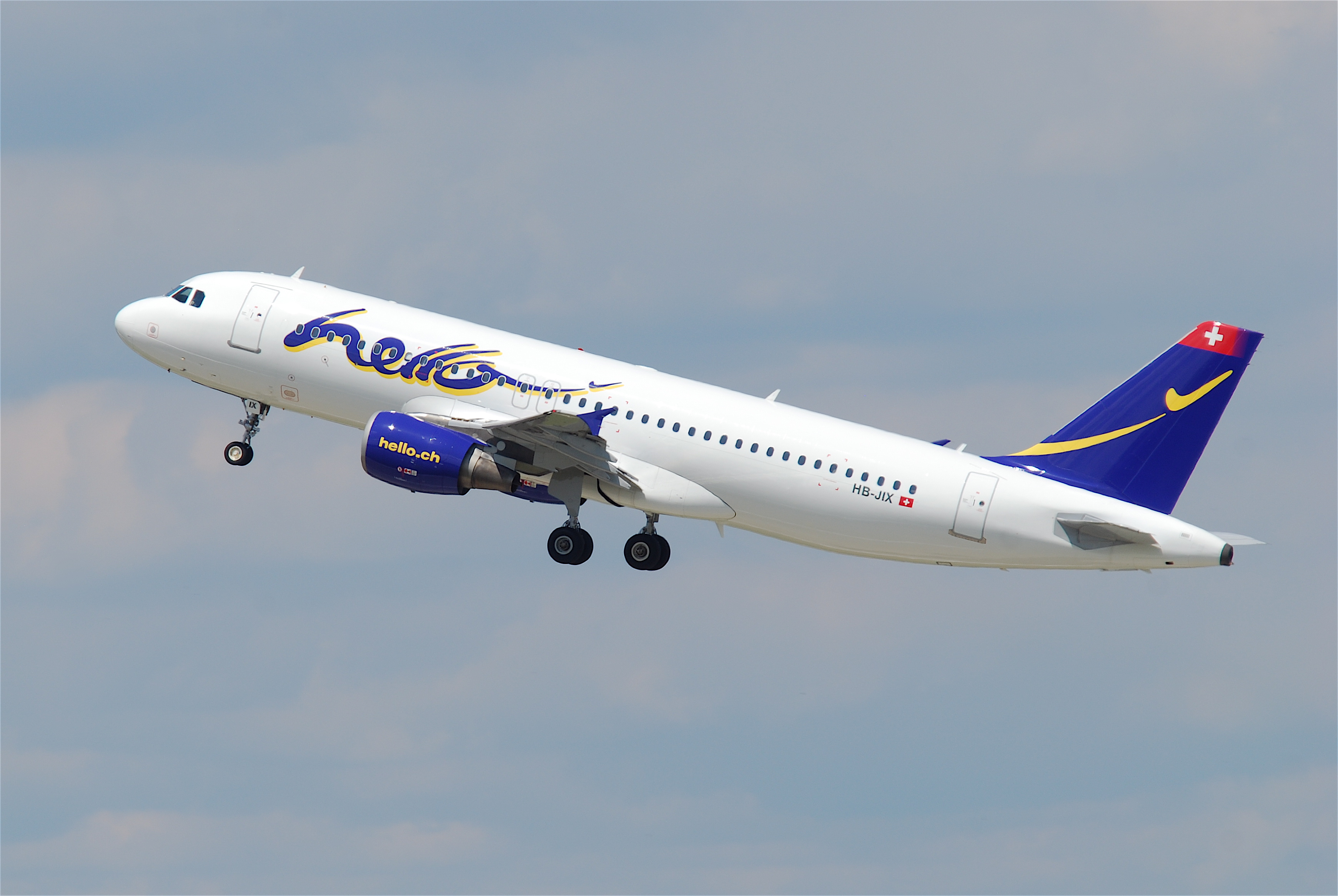
Hello Airbus A320-200

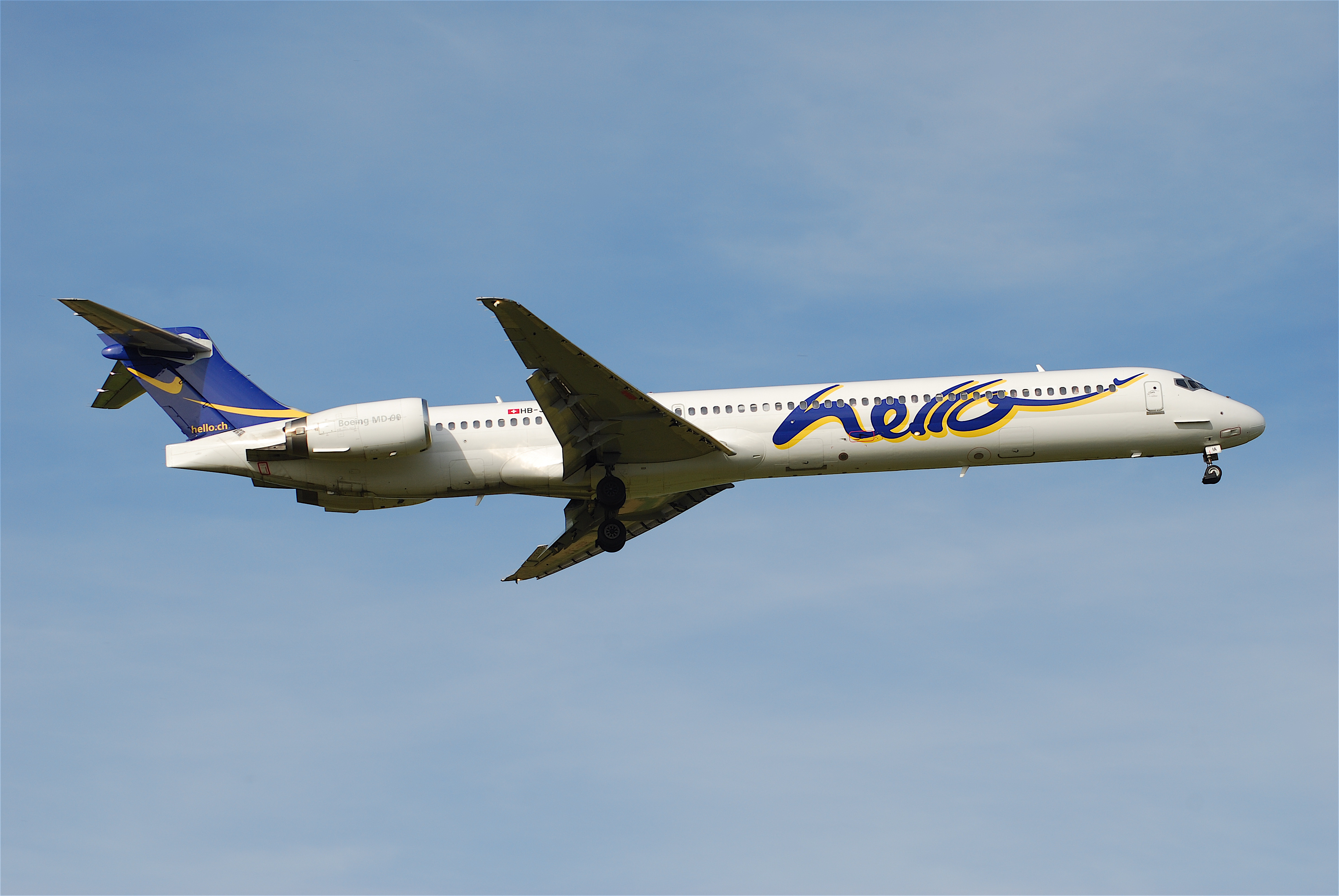
Hello McDonnell Douglas MD-90

=== Fleet at closure ===
The Hello fleet consisted of the following aircraft (as of April 2012):

Aircraft	In Fleet	Orders	Passengers
Airbus A320-200	5	—	174 / 180
Total	5	—	

=== Previously retired fleet ===
Hello previously also operated the following aircraft:

Aircraft	Total	Introduced	Retired	Notes
McDonnell Douglas MD-90	6	2004	2011	replaced by Airbus A320-200s
