= Sylvía Rún Hálfdánardóttir =

Icelandic basketball player (born 1998)

Ármann
- Position: Guard/forward
- League: Úrvalsdeild kvenna

Personal information
- Born: 20 September 1998 (age 28)
- Listed height: 181 cm (5 ft 11 in)

Career information
- Playing career: 2012–2020; 2025–present

Career history
- 2012–2016: Haukar
- 2016–2018: Stjarnan
- 2018–2019: Þór Akureyri
- 2019–2020: Valur
- 2025–present: Ármann

Career highlights
- Icelandic D1 Domestic All-First Team (2019); U18 European Championship All-First team (2016); Icelandic Company Cup (2015); Icelandic Basketball Cup (2014); Icelandic Super Cup (2019)

Sylvía Rún Hálfdánardóttir (born 20 September 1998) is an Icelandic basketball player and a former member of the Icelandic national basketball team.

== Playing career ==
Sylvía Rún came up through the junior ranks of Haukar and broke into the senior team in 2012. She played with Haukar until 2016, winning the Icelandic Basketball Cup in 2014 and the Icelandic Company Cup in 2015.

After starting the 2016–2017 season with Stjarnan, she stepped away from basketball after three games for personal reasons but returned to the team the following season where she went on to average 11.0 points and 7.6 rebounds in 12 games.

In September 2018, Sylvía Rún joined 1. deild kvenna club Þór Akureyri. On 5 January 2019, Sylvía posted a quadruple-double with 11 points, 13 rebounds, 10 assists and 10 steals in a victory against Njarðvík. On 16 March 2019, she scored a career high 40 points in a 70–67 victory against Hamar. For the season she averaged 21.7 points, 12.3 rebounds and 5.1 assists. After the season she was named to the 1. deild kvenna Domestic All-First Team.

In May 2019, Sylvía signed with reigning national champions Valur. She averaged 10.3 points and 6.6 rebounds in 22 games for Valur before the season was canceled due to the coronavirus pandemic in Iceland. Following the season, she retired from competitive basketball.

In May 2025, Sylvía returned to basketball and signed with Ármann of the Úrvalsdeild kvenna.

== National team career ==
In 2016, she was named to the Tournament All-First team during the 2016 FIBA U18 Women's European Championship Division B after leading Iceland to a 4th-place finish. During the tournament she averaged 16.7 points, 10.7 rebounds and 3.4 steals. Her best game came against Finland where she had 28 points and 20 rebounds. From 2016 to 2019, she appeared in 4 games for the Icelandic national basketball team.

== Personal life ==
Sylvía's parents, Hálfdán Markússon and Sóley Indriðadóttir, both played basketball for Haukar. Her sister, Margrét Rósa Hálfdánardóttir, played college basketball for Canisius College and played 12 games for the Icelandic national team.

== Awards, titles and accomplishments ==
=== Individual awards ===
- Division I Domestic All-First Team: 2019
- U18 European Championship Division B All-First team: 2016

=== Titles ===
- Icelandic Basketball Cup: 2014
- Icelandic Company Cup: 2015
- Icelandic Super Cup: 2019
