= Unnur Tara Jónsdóttir =

Icelandic basketball player

Personal information
- Born: 18 May 1989 (age 37) Akranes, Iceland
- Listed height: 181 cm (5 ft 11 in)

Career information
- Playing career: 2005–2010; 2017–2023
- Position: Power forward

Career history
- 2005–2008: Haukar
- 2008–2009: Salama Vaasa
- 2009–2010: KR
- 2017–2021: KR
- 2023: Stjarnan

Career highlights
- Úrvalsdeild Playoffs MVP (2010); 3× Icelandic champion (2006, 2007, 2010); Icelandic Basketball Cup (2007); 2× Icelandic Super Cup (2006, 2009); 2× Icelandic Company Cup (2006, 2009)

Unnur Tara Jónsdóttir (born 18 May 1989) is an Icelandic former basketball player and a former member of the Icelandic women's national basketball team. During her career, she won the Icelandic championship three times and was named the 2010 Úrvalsdeild Playoffs MVP.

== Playing career ==
Unnur started her senior team career with Haukar in the Úrvalsdeild kvenna in 2005 and won the national championship with the club in 2006 and 2007. After spending the 2008–2009 season with Salama Vaasa in Finland, she signed with Úrvalsdeild club KR in June 2018 She had an outstanding performances during the playoffs, helping KR advance to the Úrvalsdeild finals where they met Hamar in a best-of-five series. In game three of the finals series, she scored 33 points, making 13 of her 19 shots. In the fifth and deciding game of the series, she led KR to the championship, scoring a game high 27 points. For her performance, she was named the Úrvalsdeild Playoffs MVP.

After the season she stepped away from basketball and moved to Hungary to pursue a medical degree.

She returned to KR in 2017, helping the club win the second-tier 1. deild kvenna with a perfect 30–0 season and achieve promotion back to the Úrvalsdeild. On 6 February 2019, with KR in first place, Unnur Tara suffered an anterior cruciate ligament injury in a victory against Breiðablik and was initially ruled out for the rest of the season. She returned to the court on 20 March, scoring 14 points in KR's unexpected loss to last-place Breiðablik. In 22 appearances during the regular season, she averaged 9.1 points and 6.2 rebounds. In the playoffs, KR lost to eventual champions Valur 3–1. In the four games, Unnur averaged 5.8 points and 4.0 rebounds.

In KR's second game of the 2019–20 season on 16 October, Unnur, who is a practicing medical doctor outside of basketball, was involved in a controversy with referee Ísak Ernir Kristinsson after she requested permission to enter the court during a stoppage to attend to a teammate who had been suffered a serious leg injury after a hard landing moments before. Ísak denied her the permission and gave her a technical foul after she indicated that she would then ask one of the other referees at the game for permission instead. After the incident caused an uproar with fans, the Icelandic Basketball Association Referee Committee issued a statement where it stated that Ísak admitted that it had been a mistake on his behalf to deny Unnur permission to attend to her injured teammate and that the Committee agreed with that assessment. On 3 September 2020, KR announced that Unnur would not play with the team in the upcoming season. She later returned to the team and played her first game back on 17 February 2021. She appeared in 9 games during the season, averaging 4.4 points and 6.7 rebounds per game.

After a two-year absence, Unnur signed with Stjarnan in September 2023.

== National team career ==
Unnur Tara played 3 games for the Icelandic women's national basketball team in 2007. In November 2018, she was selected to the national team, following a hiatus of 11 years, for its upcoming games in the EuroBasket Women 2019 qualification.

== Awards, titles and accomplishments ==
=== Individual awards ===
- Úrvalsdeild Playoffs MVP: 2010

=== Titles ===
- Icelandic champion (3): 2006, 2007, 2010
- Icelandic Basketball Cup: 2010
- Icelandic Supercup (2): 2006, 2009
- Icelandic Company Cup (2): 2006, 2009
- 1. deild kvenna: 2018

== Personal life ==
Unnur is a practicing medical doctor. In 2021 she served as the team doctor of Haukar in the 2021–22 EuroCup.
