= Guðbjörg Sverrisdóttir =

Icelandic basketball player

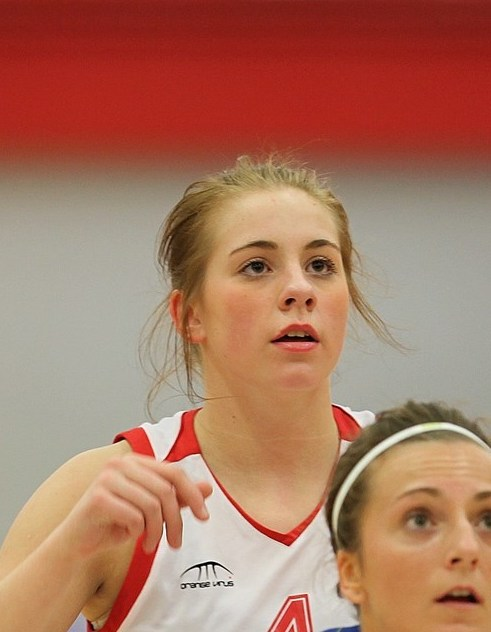
- Guðbjörg við Haukar in 2009

Personal information
- Born: 10 October 1992 (age 34)
- Listed height: 180 cm (5 ft 11 in)

Career information
- Playing career: 2007–2026
- Position: Guard
- Number: 4

Career history
- 2007–2009: Haukar
- 2007–2008: → Haukar-b
- 2009–2011: Hamar
- 2011–2026: Valur

Career highlights
- Úrvalsdeild Domestic All-First Team (2016); 5×Icelandic champion (2007, 2009, 2019, 2021, 2023); 2×Icelandic Cup (2007, 2019); Icelandic Super Cup (2019); Icelandic Company Cup (2013); 3× Icelandic All-Star (2010, 2013, 2014)

Career Úrvalsdeild kvenna statistics
- Points: 2,910 (7.1 ppg)
- Rebounds: 1,777 (4.3 rpg)
- Games: 410
Medals
Women's basketball
Representing Iceland
Games of the Small States of Europe
Silver medal – second place	2015 Reykjavík	Team
Silver medal – second place	2017 San Marino	Team

Guðbjörg Sverrisdóttir (born 10 October 1992) is an Icelandic former basketball player. A five-time Icelandic national champion, she is the Úrvalsdeild kvenna all-time leader in games played.

== Career ==
Guðbjörg came up through the junior teams of Haukar and played her first games with the senior team during the 2006–2007 season.

In 2010, Guðbjörg helped Hamar to the Úrvalsdeild finals where they lost to KR in five games.

On February 16, 2013, Guðbjörg dislocated her shoulder in the first half of Valur's Icelandic Cup finals game against Keflavík. She returned to the court in second half, after the team physician popped the shoulder back in the socket, and was a major catalyst in Valur's comeback to the game. However, with two minutes left of the third quarter, Guðbjörg ruptured her achilles tendon, and without her Keflavík won a narrow 68–60 victory.

After going through illness during the 2014–2015 season, Guðbjörg recovered and was named to the Úrvalsdeild Domestic All-First Team in 2016.

On April 13, 2018, she helped Valur knock out defending champions Keflavík in the Úrvalsdeild semi-finals. In the series clinching game, she had 14 points, 9 assists and 8 rebounds. In the Úrvalsdeild finals, she faced Haukar, led by her sister Helena Sverrisdóttir. After splitting the first four games, Valur lost the fifth and deciding game, 74–70.

On 16 February 2019, she won the Icelandic Cup after Valur defeated Stjarnan in the Cup finals, 74–90.

On 27 April 2019, she helped Valur win its first ever national championship after beating Keflavík in the Úrvalsdeild finals 3–0.

Valur opened the 2019–20 season by defeating Keflavík, 105–81, in the annual Icelandic Super Cup behinds Guðbjörg's team-high 22 points. It was Valur's first Super Cup win and the victory made them the holders of all four major national crowns, the others being the national championship, the national cup and the league championship which is awarded for the best regular season record in the Úrvalsdeild.

On 2 June 2021, she won the national championship after Valur beat Haukar 3–0 in the Úrvalsdeild finals.

On 28 April 2023, she won her fifth Icelandic championship after Valur defeated top-seeded Keflavík in the Úrvalsdeild finals, 3–1.

On 21 January 2025, she became the Úrvalsdeild all-time leader in games played, breaking Sigrún Sjöfn Ámundadóttir's record of 382 games. In the game, she also scored her 1,000 basket. In December 2025, she became the first female player, and the seventh overall, to play in 400 top-tier league games in Iceland.

In April 2026, she announced her retirement from basketball.

== Icelandic national team ==
Guðbjörg played her first game for the Icelandic national basketball team in 2014. She won silver with Iceland at the Games of the Small States of Europe in 2015 and 2017.

As of 1 May 2018, she has played 16 games for the national team.

== Personal life ==
Guðbjörg parents are Sverrir Hjörleifsson and Svanhildur Guðlaugsdóttir. Guðbjörg 's sister, Helena Sverrisdóttir, is an 11-time Icelandic Basketball Player of the Year and a member of the Icelandic national team. Her brother, Kristján Leifur Sverrisson, played for Haukar in Úrvalsdeild karla.

== Awards, titles and accomplishments ==
=== Individual awards ===
- Úrvalsdeild Domestic All-First Team (4): 2016
- Úrvalsdeild Young Player of the Year: 2010

=== Titles ===
- Icelandic champion (5): 2007, 2009, 2019, 2021, 2023
- Icelandic Basketball Cup (2): 2007, 2019
- Icelandic Super Cup: 2019
- Icelandic Company Cup: 2013

=== Accomplishments ===
- Icelandic All-Star (3): 2010, 2013, 2014
- Úrvalsdeild kvenna all-time career games played leader
