= Lovísa Henningsdóttir =

Icelandic basketball player (born 1995)

Lovísa Björt Henningsdóttir
Personal information
- Born: 11 October 1995 (age 31)
- Listed height: 188 cm (6 ft 2 in)

Career information
- High school: The Rock of Gainesville (Gainesville, Florida, U.S.)
- College: Marist (2015–2019)
- Playing career: 2009–2026
- Position: Forward
- Number: 5

Career history
- 2009–2014: Haukar
- 2019–2026: Haukar

Career highlights
- Icelandic champion (2025); 4× Icelandic Cup winner (2014, 2021–2023); 2× Icelandic Super Cup (2021, 2023)

Lovísa Björt Henningsdóttir (born 11 October 1995) is an Icelandic former basketball player. She played her entire senior team career for Haukar of the Úrvalsdeild kvenna. She played college basketball for Marist of the Metro Atlantic Athletic Conference from 2014 to 2019. In 2019, she debuted with the Icelandic national team.

== Playing career ==
=== Early career ===
Lovísa came up through the junior programs of Haukar and played her first senior game with the team in the top-tier Úrvalsdeild kvenna in 2009. She spent the 2011-2012 season in the Efterskolen Ved Nyborg basketball academy in Denmark. After her return, Lovísa appeared in 15 games during the 2012-2013 season, averaging 3.0 points. In 2013-2014, she appeared in a career high 33 games, averaging 5.6 points and 3.2 rebounds per game. On 22 February 2014, she won the Icelandic Cup after Haukar defeated Snæfell in the Cup finals.

=== High school career ===
Lovísa attended The Rock of Gainesville high school in Gainesville, Florida for the 2014-2015 season, where she averaged 17.8 points, 8.1 rebound, 3.1 blocks and 2.6 steals per game.

=== College career ===
Lovísa joined Marist College in 2015. In 29 games during her freshman season, she started four for the Red Foxes averaging 9.2 minutes per game and 2.2 points per game.

On 17 December 2016, she scored 21 points, including 6 three pointers, in a 66-61 victory against. For the 2016-2017 season, she started all 32 games for the Red Foxes, averaging 27.7 minutes per game, 8.9 points per game, and 4.9 rebounds per game. In April 2017, she underwent a hip surgery which forced her to miss the upcoming training camp for the Icelandic women's national basketball team. During her senior season, Lovísa appeared in 33 games, averaging 7.6 points per game.

=== Return to Iceland ===
After the college season finished, Lovísa signed a 1-year contract with Haukar for the 2019-20 season. For the season she averaged 11.9 points and 6.6 rebounds. In May 2020, she renewed her contract for the 2020–21 season.

On 18 September 2021, Lovísa won the Icelandic Cup with Haukar after a 94–89 victory against Fjölnir in the Cup finals. On 19 March 2022, she won the Icelandic Cup again after Haukar defeated Breiðablik in the 2022 Cup Finals. In the Úrvalsdeild, she averaged 12.3 points and 4.5 rebounds during the regular season and 7.9 points and 3.9 rebounds during the playoffs, helping Haukar to the Úrvalsdeild Finals where they lost 2–3 to Njarðvík.

Lovísa missed the beginning of the 2022–23 season with a shoulder injury, making her season debut on 28 December 2022. On 14 January 2023, she scored 3 points in Haukar's 94–66 win against Keflavík in the Icelandic Cup final. On 30 March 2023, she scored a season high 31 points in a victory against Breiðablik.

On 20 September 2023, she scored 12 points in Haukar's 78-77 win against Valur in the Icelandic Super Cup.

In May 2025, she won the national championship with Haukar.

In August 2026, she announced her retirement from basketball.

=== National team career ===
Lovísa played 27 games for the Icelandic junior national teams from 2010 to 2015. On 14 November 2019, she played her first senior game for the Icelandic national team when it faced Bulgaria in the EuroBasket Women 2021 qualification.

== Personal life ==
Lovísa is the daughter of former basketball player Henning Henningsson who played 30 games for the Icelandic men's national team from 1985 to 1993. Her brother is basketball player Hilmar Smári Henningsson.

== Career statistics ==
Legend
GP	Games played	GS	Games started	MPG	Minutes per game
FG%	Field goal percentage	3P%	3-point field goal percentage	FT%	Free throw percentage
RPG	Rebounds per game	APG	Assists per game	SPG	Steals per game
BPG	Blocks per game	PPG	Points per game	**Bold**	Career high

=== Marist College ===
Year	Team	GP	Points	FG%	3P%	FT%	RPG	APG	SPG	BPG	PPG
2015-16	Marist	30	65	33.8%	28.2%	46.2%	1.3	0.5	0.3	0.3	2.2
2016-17	Marist	32	**284**	40.3%	34.7%	**81.3%**	**4.9**	**1.3**	**0.9**	1.1	**8.9**
2017-18	Marist	20	69	32.6%	25.0%	40.0%	2.5	0.3	0.4	0.6	3.5
2018-19	Marist	**33**	251	**43.1%**	**36.1%**	62.5%	2.9	0.4	0.6	**1.3**	7.6
Career		115	669	39.5%	33.3%	66.2%	3.0	0.7	0.5	0.9	5.8
