= Thelma Dís Ágústsdóttir =

Icelandic basketball player (born 1998)

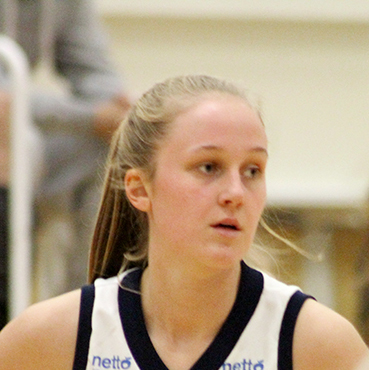
- Thelma Dís in December 2014

No. 10 – Keflavík
- Position: Forward
- League: Úrvalsdeild kvenna

Personal information
- Born: 30 September 1998 (age 28)
- Listed height: 182 cm (6 ft 0 in)

Career information
- College: Ball State (2018–2023)
- Playing career: 2013–present

Career history
- 2013–2018: Keflavík
- 2021: Keflavík
- 2023–present: Keflavík

Career highlights
- Icelandic Female Basketball Player of the Year (2024); MAC All-Freshman Team (2019); Icelandic champion (2017); 2x Icelandic Cup (2017, 2018); 2x Icelandic Super Cup (2013, 2017); Icelandic Company Cup (2014); Úrvalsdeild Domestic Player of the Year (2017); 3x Úrvalsdeild Domestic All-First Team (2017, 2018, 2025); Úrvalsdeild Young Player of the Year (2016)
Medals
Women's basketball
Representing Iceland
Games of the Small States of Europe
| Silver medal – second place | 2017 San Marino | Team |
| Silver medal – second place | 2019 Bar | Team |

Thelma Dís Ágústsdóttir (born 30 September 1998) is an Icelandic basketball player for Keflavík of the Úrvalsdeild kvenna. She played college basketball for Ball State University. Thelma won the Icelandic championship and the Icelandic Basketball Cup in 2017 when she was named the Úrvalsdeild kvenna Domestic Player of the Year. In 2024, she was named the Icelandic Female Basketball Player of the Year.

== Basketball career ==
=== Keflavík 2013–2018 ===
Thelma came up through the junior ranks of Keflavík, playing her first games during the 2013–2014 season.

In February 2017, she won the Icelandic Cup with Keflavík. She helped Keflavík to win the national championship in 2017, defeating reigning champions Snæfell 3–1 in the finals. In the fourth and deciding game, she had 13 points, 7 rebounds and 5 assists in Keflavík's 70–50 victory. After the season, she was named the Úrvalsdeild Kvenna Domestic Player of the Year.

Despite interest from colleges in the United States, she returned to Keflavík for the 2017–2018 season, helping them win the 2018 Icelandic Cup.

=== Ball State Cardinals 2018–2021 ===
In June 2018, she agreed to play for Ball State University in the Mid-American Conference. During her freshman season, she started all 31 games, averaging 9.6 points and 4.1 rebounds per game.

On 31 December 2019, she scored 21 points and made 5 of her three-point shots in an 84–49 victory against Urbana University.

During her final season, she averaged 11.8 points while making 44% of her three-point shots.

=== Return to Keflavík 2021 ===
On 10 May, it was announced that Thelma would play with Keflavík during the 2021 Úrvalsdeild playoffs. She appeared in all three games during Keflavík's first round loss against Haukar where she averaged 6.0 points and 3.7 assists per game.

=== Ball State Cardinals 2021–2023 ===
Following the playoffs, she announced that she would return to Ball State to finish her master's degree and her remaining college eligibility.

=== Post-college 2023 ===
On 21 May 2023, Thelma signed with Keflavík once again.

On 20 December 2024, she was named the Icelandic Female Basketball Player of the Year.

== National team career ==
Thelma Dís was selected to the Icelandic national team for the first time in November 2016. She was part of Iceland's squad that won silver at the 2017 Games of the Small States of Europe.

On 17 November 2026, she set the national team single game record with 41 points and 13 three pointers in a 129–41 win against Azerbaijan in the EuroBasket 2029 pre-qualifiers. She also set the senior team record for Iceland, breaking Teitur Örlygsson's record of 40 points from 1994 and Herbert Arnarson's record of 10 three pointers from 1997.

== Personal life ==
Thelma Dís is the daughter of Björg Hafsteinsdóttir, a former basketball player who won multiple titles with Keflavík and was named the Domestic player of the year in 1990.
