= Kristrún Sigurjónsdóttir =

Icelandic former basketball player

Personal information
- Born: 14 March 1985 (age 41) Iceland
- Listed height: 176 cm (5 ft 9 in)

Career information
- Playing career: 2001–2018, 2020–2021
- Position: Guard/forward

Career history
- 2001–2002: ÍR/Breiðablik
- 2002–2004: ÍR
- 2004–2009: Haukar
- 2009–2011: Hamar
- 2011–2015: Valur
- 2015–2017: Skallagrímur
- 2017–2018: Valur
- 2020–2021: ÍR

Career highlights
- 4× Úrvalsdeild Domestic All-First Team (2008–2010, 2013); 3× Icelandic champion (2006, 2007, 2009); Icelandic Cup (2007); Icelandic Supercup (2006); 3× Icelandic Company Cup (2005, 2006, 2013); 8× Icelandic All-Star (2004, 2006–2009, 2011, 2013, 2014)

Kristrún Sigurjónsdóttir (born 14 March 1985) is an Icelandic former basketball player and a former member of the Icelandic national basketball team. During her career, she won the Icelandic championship three times as a member of Haukar.

== Playing career ==
Kristrún's first senior games where for the joint team of ÍR/Breiðablik in the second-tier league. After helping ÍR win the league and gain promotion in 2003, she debuted in the top-tier league during the 2003–2004 season where she averaged 10.5 points in 18 games. After ÍR's relegation that season, she transferred to Haukar where she won back-to-back national championships in 2006 and 2007. She was one of the league's best players during the 2008–2009 season, averaging a career high 19.4 points during the regular season. Despite battling a groin injury for all the playoffs, she helped Haukar beat KR in the playoff finals for the national championship.

After the season, she signed with Hamar. During her first season with Hamar, she averaged 17.5 points per game and helped the team to the national championship finals for the first time.

Kristrún played for Valur from 2011 to 2015 when she signed with Skallagrímur. She helped Skallagrímur win the 1. deild in 2016 and return to the Úrvalsdeild for the first time since 1976. She returned to Valur in September 2017 and played one season before retiring in 2018.

After two seasons away, Kristrún made a comeback with ÍR in 2020. In her first game back, she had 16 points and 8 rebounds in a victory against Njarðvík.

== Icelandic national team ==
From 2005 to 2014, Kristrún played 34 games for the Icelandic national basketball team.

== Awards, titles and accomplishments ==
=== Individual awards ===
- Úrvalsdeild Domestic All-First Team (4): 2008, 2009, 2010, 2013
- Division I Domestic All-First Team : 2016

=== Titles ===
- Icelandic champion (3): 2006, 2007, 2009
- Icelandic Basketball Cup : 2007
- Icelandic Supercup : 2006
- Icelandic Company Cup (3): 2005, 2006, 2013
- Icelandic Division I (2): 2003, 2016
