= Ágúst Björgvinsson =

Icelandic professional basketball coach

Personal information
- Born: 16 January 1979 (age 47) Iceland

Career information
- Coaching career: 2001–present

Career history

Playing
- 1998–1999: Valur

Coaching
- 2003: Valur (Men's)
- 2004–2007: Haukar (Women's)
- 2006: Haukar (Men's)
- 2007: KR (Men's, assistant)
- 2007–2011: Hamar (Men's)
- 2007–2009: Iceland (Women's)
- 2009–2011: Hamar (Women's)
- 2011–2014: Valur (Women's)
- 2011–2020: Valur (Men's)
- 2019–2022: Iceland men's U-20
- 2022–present: Valur (Men's, assistant)

Career highlights
- As coach: 3x Úrvalsdeild kvenna Coach of the year (2005–2007); 2x Icelandic Women's League champion (2006, 2007); 2x Icelandic Women's Cup (2005, 2007); Icelandic Women's Supercup (2006); As assistant coach: Icelandic Men's Cup (2007, 2023); Icelandic Men's Supercup (2007)

Ágúst Sigurður Björgvinsson (born 16 January 1979) is an Icelandic professional basketball coach who last coached Úrvalsdeild karla club Valur. He was the head coach of the Icelandic women's national basketball team from 2007 to 2009 and won back-to-back national championships with Haukar women's team in 2006 and 2007.

== Coaching career ==
Ágúst was the head coach of Haukar women's team from 2004 to 2007. In 2005, he helped the club to its first major title in thirteen years, winning the Icelandic Women's Cup. In 2006, he guided Haukar to the national championship and in the 2006–2007 season the club won all five major titles; the national championship, the Icelandic Cup, the Super Cup, the Company Cup and the Divisional Crown for posting the best record in the league. He left Haukar after the season to pursue coaching opportunities in Lithuania.

In July 2007, Ágúst was hired as an assistant coach to KR men's team. On 7 November 2007 Ágúst was hired as the head coach of Hamar's men's team after Pétur Ingvarsson's resignation. He guided Hamar women's team to the Úrvalsdeild kvenna finals in 2010 where it lost to KR.

In April 2011, Ágúst was hired as the head coach of Valur men's and women's teams. In May 2015, he stepped down as the head coach of Valur women's team.

In February 2019, he signed a two-year contract to be the head coach of the Icelandic men's national under-20 basketball team.

In May 2020, Ágúst was replaced with Finnur Freyr Stefánsson as the head coach of Valur.

== Awards, titles and accomplishments ==
=== Individual awards ===
- Úrvalsdeild Kvenna Coach of the year (3) : 2005, 2006, 2007

=== Titles ===
==== Men's leagues ====
- Icelandic Cup: 2023^{1}
- Icelandic Supercup: 2007^{1}
- 1. deild karla: 2008

^{1} Assistant coach

==== Women's leagues ====
- Icelandic champion (2): 2006, 2007
- Icelandic Cup (2): 2005, 2007
- Icelandic Supercup: 2006
- Icelandic Company Cup (3): 2005, 2006, 2013
