= Ólöf Helga Pálsdóttir =

Icelandic basketball player and coach

Personal information
- Born: 24 May 1985 (age 41)
- Listed height: 172 cm (5 ft 8 in)

Career information
- Playing career: 1999–2020
- Position: Guard
- Number: 7
- Coaching career: 2017–present

Career history

Playing
- 1999–2002: Grindavík
- 2003–2009: Grindavík
- 2009–2012: Njarðvík
- 2012–2013: Grindavík
- 2018: Grindavík
- 2020: Grindavík-b

Coaching
- 2017–2018: Grindavík (assistant)
- 2018: Grindavík
- 2018–2020: Haukar
- 2020–2021: Grindavík

Career highlights
- As player: Icelandic champion (2012); Icelandic Cup (2008, 2012); Icelandic Company Cup (2001)

Ólöf Helga Pálsdóttir Woods (born 24 May 1985) is an Icelandic TV presenter and basketball coach. She was a multi-sport athlete, playing several seasons in both the Icelandic top-tier basketball and football leagues. She won the national basketball championship in 2012 and the Icelandic Basketball Cup in 2008 and 2012. She represented the Icelandic national basketball team internationally.

== Basketball ==
=== Playing career ===
Ólöf came up through the junior ranks of Grindavík, playing her first games with the senior team during the 1999–2000 season. In December 2001, she helped Grindavík win the Icelandic Company Cup, the team's first major trophy since winning the national championship in 1997. Her season was however cut short in March as she tore her anterior cruciate ligament, causing her to miss the playoffs. She spent the 2002–03 season in the United States but returned the following season, averaging 8.8 points and 6.0 rebounds in 19 games.

After spending her entire career with Grindavík, Ólöf signed with newly promoted Njarðvík in July 2009. She helped Njarðvík to the Úrvalsdeild finals in 2011 by knocking out top ranked Hamar in the semi-finals. In the finals, Njarðvík was swept by Keflavík in three games.

On 18 February 2012, Ólöf helped Njarðvík to win its first major title when it defeated Snæfell in the Icelandic Cup finals. On 14 April, she led Njarðvík to the national championship, scoring 7 points and handing out 6 assists in the championship clinching game.

In August 2012, Ólöf had a serious accident that caused massive nerve damage in her right arm. Due to the injury she missed all but three games of the 2012–2013 season and was ultimately forced to retire from playing basketball. She had a short comeback in 2018 with Grindavík, which she coached, appearing in two games due to injuries on the squad, and in 2020 when she appeared in one game with Grindavík-b in the second-tier 1. deild kvenna.

=== National team career ===
Ólöf played in seven games for the Icelandic national basketball team from 2004 to 2012.

=== Coaching career ===
After her basketball career came to an end, Ólöf took up coaching for Grindavík's junior program. In November 2016, she came under scrutiny after her U-18 team defeated Njarðvík's U-18 team 101–2.

In December 2017, Ólöf, was hired as an assistant coach to Grindavík's senior women's team. In February 2018, she replaced Angela Rodriguez as the head coach. She helped the team to a 4th-place finish and a spot in the promototion playoffs where the winner would be promoted to the Úrvalsdeild kvenna. In the playoffs, Grindavík lost to KR in the semi-finals.

In May 2018, Ólöf Helga was hired as the head coach of reigning national champions Haukar. Prior to her arrival, Haukar had lost several key players from the championship run, including Helena Sverrisdóttir. In her first game at the helm, Haukar lost in the Super Cup to Keflavík, 77–83. For the season, Haukar ended with a 9–19 record and missed out of the playoffs.

In February 2020, she led Haukar to the semi-finals of the Icelandic Cup where it bowed out against eventual cup winners Skallagrímur. On 28 February 2020, with 6 games left of the season, the board of Haukar announced it had fired Ólöf. At the time the team was in heavy playoff contention with a 13–9 record in fifth place, one victory away from third place.

On 11 May 2020, Ólöf was hired as the head coach of Grindavík. She guided Grindavík to an 11–5 record and promotion back to the Úrvalsdeild.

=== Titles ===
- Icelandic champion: 2012
- Icelandic Cup (2): 2008, 2012
- Icelandic Company Cup: 2001

== Football ==
Ólöf Helga Pálsdóttir
Personal information
- Position: Striker

Senior career*
Years	Team	Apps	(Gls)
1999–2001	Grindavík	15	(5)
2004–2006	Keflavík	38	(30)
2007–2008	GRV	16	(10)
- * Club domestic league appearances and goals as of 14:34, 2 January 2018 (UTC)

Ólöf appeared in 35 matches in the Icelandic top-tier football league for Grindavík and Keflavík, scoring 8 goals. Playing the striker position, her best season came in 2004 when she helped Keflavík win 1. deild kvenna by scoring 24 goals in 15 matches, including 5 goals in the promotion playoffs.

=== Titles ===
- 1. deild kvenna (2): 2000, 2004

== Television ==
Ólöf worked as an analyst for the basketball postgame show Körfuboltakvöld for several years before taking over as the host in September 2025.
