= Margrét Rósa Hálfdánardóttir =

Icelandic basketball player

Personal information
- Born: 2 June 1994 (age 32)
- Listed height: 174 cm (5 ft 9 in)

Career information
- College: Canisius (2014–2018)
- Playing career: 2008–2018
- Position: Guard

Career history
- 2008–2014: Haukar

Career highlights
- Icelandic championship (2009); 2x Icelandic Basketball Cup (2010, 2014); Icelandic Company Cup (2011); Úrvalsdeild Young Player of the Year (2012); 3x MAAC All-Academic team (2016–2018)
Medals
Women's basketball
Representing Iceland
Games of the Small States of Europe
Silver medal – second place	2015 Iceland	National Team

Margrét Rósa Hálfdánardóttir (born 2 June 1994) is an Icelandic former basketball player and a former member of the Icelandic national basketball team. She won the Icelandic championship with Haukar in 2009.

== Playing career ==
=== Haukar (2008–2014) ===
After coming up through the junior ranks of Haukar, Margrét debuted with the senior team during the 2008–2009 season. She won the Icelandic championship in after Haukar beat KR 3–2 in the Úrvalsdeild finals.

She broke into the rotation during the 2011–2012 season where she averaged 10.0 points and 3.5 rebounds per game. For her efforts she was selected as the Úrvalsdeild Young Player of the Year. The following season, she averaged a career high 13.0 points along with 4.4 rebounds and 3.0 assists per game. During her last season with Haukar, Margrét averaged 11.8 points, 4.5 rebounds and 3.3 assists per game.

=== Canisius College (2014–2018) ===
In 20114, Margrét Rósa joined Canisius College. During her freshman season, she appeared in 29 games, averaging 3.7 points and 1.0 rebounds.

In 2015 she was joined at Canisius by fellow Icelander Sara Rún Hinriksdóttir. She appeared in 30 games and started 29, averaging 9.6 points, 2.4 rebounds and 2.0 assists per game while leading the team in three point accuracy, by making 43.6% of her three-point shots.

During her junior season, Margrét appeared in 31 games and made 30 starts. She averaged 9.2 points per game while making 39.2% of her three-point shots.

Margrét started 27 of 30 games played as a senior. She averaged 9.2 points per game and scored a career high 23 points against Monmouth on 16 February 2018.

After graduating from college, Margrét decided to step away from basketball.

==== College statistics ====
Legend
GP	Games played	GS	Games started	MPG	Minutes per game
FG%	Field goal percentage	3P%	3-point field goal percentage	FT%	Free throw percentage
RPG	Rebounds per game	APG	Assists per game	SPG	Steals per game
BPG	Blocks per game	PPG	Points per game	**Bold**	Career high

Year	Team	GP	Points	FG%	3P%	FT%	RPG	APG	SPG	BPG	PPG
2014-15	Canisius	29	106	37.9%	27.8%	72.0%	1.0	0.9	0.6	-	3.7
2015-16	Canisius	30	**288**	43.0%	**42.2%**	**78.8%**	**2.5**	2.0	**0.8**	0.1	**9.6**
2016-17	Canisius	**31**	286	**46.6%**	39.2%	71.4%	1.8	2.1	0.8	0.1	9.2
2017-18	Canisius	30	277	41.3%	30.3%	77.2%	2.2	**2.2**	0.7	**0.2**	9.2
Career		120	957	42.9%	35.8%	75.8%	1.9	1.8	0.7	0.1	8.0

== National team career ==
After debuting with the Icelandic national team in 2014, Margrét went on to play 12 games for the team. Due to commitments to the Canisius College, she was unable to join the national team for most of her college career.

== Personal life ==
Margrét's parents, Hálfdán Markússon and Sóley Indriðadóttir, both played basketball for Haukar. Her sister, Sylvía Rún Hálfdánardóttir, plays for the Icelandic national team.
