= Eva Margrét Kristjánsdóttir =

Icelandic basketball player (born 1997)

Personal information
- Born: 17 January 1997 (age 29)
- Listed height: 186 cm (6 ft 1 in)

Career information
- Playing career: 2010–present
- Position: Forward

Career history
- 2010–2013: KFÍ
- 2013–2014: Snæfell
- 2014–2015: KFÍ
- 2015–2016: Haukar
- 2018–2023: Haukar
- 2023: Keilor Thunder
- 2024–2025: Haukar

Career highlights
- Úrvalsdeild Domestic Player of the Year (2023); 2× Úrvalsdeild Domestic All-First Team (2022, 2023); 1. deild Young Player of the Year (2015); 2× Icelandic champion (2014, 2025); 3× Icelandic Cup (2021–2023); Icelandic Super Cup (2021)

Eva Margrét Kristjánsdóttir (born 17 January 1997) is an Icelandic basketball player. She won the Icelandic championship with Snæfell in 2014 and Haukar in 2025. With Haukar, she has also won the Icelandic Cup three times from 2021 to 2023. A two-time Úrvalsdeild Domestic All-First Team selection, she was named the Úrvalsdeild Domestic Player of the Year in 2023. On the international level, she has reprecented the Icelandic national basketball team.

== Playing career ==
Eva Margrét started her career with KFÍ in the 1. deild kvenna in 2010. In 2013, she signed with Snæfell and was a key member of its 2014 championship team. She returned to KFÍ for the 2014–2015 season when she was named the 1. deild Young Player of the Year.

She joined Haukar in 2015. After sitting out the next two seasons, Eva Margrét returned to Haukar prior to the 2018–2019 season. She helped Haukar to the Icelandic Cup in September 2021, scoring 9 points in Haukar's 94–89 win against Fjölnir. The club repeated as Cup winners in March 2022, with Eva Margrét scoring 16 points in Haukar's 88–81 win against Breiðablik. During the 2021–2022 Úrvalsdeild season, she was named to the Úrvalsdeild Domestic All-First Team after helping Haukar to the Úrvalsdeild finals where the team lost to Njarðvík 2–3.

On 14 January 2023, she scored 11 points in Haukar's 94–66 win against Keflavík in the Icelandic Cup final. Following the season, she was named the Úrvalsdeild Domestic Player of the Year.

In March 2023, Eva Margrét agreed to join Keilor Thunder of the Australian NBL1 on a loan following the end of the season with Haukar. In April 2023, she signed a 3-year contract extension with Haukar.

In June 2024, Eva Margrét joined Haukar again.

== National team career ==
In 2011, Eva Margrét was selected to the Icelandic Under-15 national team and the following year to the Under-16 team. In 2014, she was selected to the 25 training group for the senior national team but was unable to attend. In October 2020, Eva Margrét debuted with the Icelandic national team.
