= 2022–23 Úrvalsdeild kvenna (basketball) =

Subway deild kvenna^{1}
- Duration: 20 September 2022 – 28 April 2023
- Teams: 8
- TV partner: Stöð 2 Sport

Regular season
- League champions: Keflavík

Finals
- Champions: Valur
- Runners-up: Keflavík
- Semi-finalists: Haukar, Njarðvík
- Playoffs MVP: (United States) Kiana Johnson

Statistical leaders
Points	(United States) Aliyah Collier	22.1
Rebounds	(United States) Aliyah Collier	12.7
Assists	(United States) Kiana Johnson	7.9
- All statistics correct as of 29 April 2023.^{1} Sponsored league name, referring to Úrvalsdeild kvenna.

The 2022–23 Úrvalsdeild kvenna was the 66th season of the Úrvalsdeild kvenna, the top tier women's basketball league on Iceland. The season started on 20 September 2022 and concluded on 28 April 2023 with Valur winning the national championship after beating Keflavík in the Úrvalsdeild finals, 3–1. Kiana Johnson of Valur was named the Finals MVP.

== Competition format ==
The participating teams first play a conventional round-robin schedule with every team playing each opponent twice "home" and twice "away" for a total of 28 games. The top four teams qualify for the championship playoffs whilst the bottom team will be relegated to 1. deild kvenna.

== Teams ==
Team	City, Region	Arena	Head coach
Breiðablik	Kópavogur	Smárinn	(United States) Jeremy Herbert Smith
Grindavík	Grindavík	HS Orku-höllin	(Iceland) Þorleifur Ólafsson
Fjölnir	Grafarvogur	Dalhús	(Iceland) Kristjana Eir Jónsdóttir
Haukar	Hafnarfjörður	Schenkerhöllin	(Iceland) Bjarni Magnússon
ÍR	Reykjavík	Hertz-Hellirinn	(Iceland) Sigurbjörg Rós Sigurðardóttir
Keflavík	Keflavík	TM Höllin	(Iceland) Hörður Axel Vilhjálmsson
Njarðvík	Njarðvík	Ljónagryfjan	(Iceland) Rúnar Ingi Erlingsson
Valur	Reykjavík	Origo-völlurinn	(Iceland) Ólafur Jónas Sigurðsson

=== Managerial changes ===
Team	Outgoing manager	Manner of departure	Date of vacancy	Position in table	Replaced with	Date of appointment
Fjölnir	(Iceland) Halldór Karl Þórisson	End of contract	22 April 2022	Off-season	(Iceland) Kristjana Eir Jónsdóttir	30 May 2022
Keflavík	(Iceland) Jón Halldór Eðvaldsson	End of contract	15 May 2022	Off-season	(Iceland) Hörður Axel Vilhjálmsson	15 May 2022
ÍR	(Iceland) Kristjana Eir Jónsdóttir	End of contract	30 May 2022	Off-season	(Iceland) Ari Gunnarsson	12 June 2022
Breiðablik	(Iceland) Ívar Ásgrímsson	End of contract	29 June 2022	Off-season	(Iceland) Yngvi Gunnlaugsson	29 June 2022
ÍR	(Iceland) Ari Gunnarsson	Resigned	25 October 2022	8th	(Iceland) Sigurbjörg Rós Sigurðardóttir	25 October 2022
Breiðablik	(Iceland) Yngvi Gunnlaugsson	Resigned	21 November 2022	7th	(United States) Jeremy Herbert Smith	21 November 2022

== Notable occurrences ==
- On 4 April, Grindavík signed two-time Úrvalsdeild assist leader and the 2018 Foreign Player of the Year, guard Danielle Rodriguez.
- On 30 May, Birna Valgerður Benónýsdóttir signed with Keflavík after spending the previous three seasons playing college basketball for Arizona and Binghamton.
- On 7 June, Elín Sóley Hrafnkelsdóttir signed with Valur after playing the previous four seasons with the University of Tulsa.
- On 7 June, Bríet Sif Hinriksdóttir signed with Njarðvík after spending the previous two seasons with Haukar.
- On 5 July, Njarðvík signed Portuguese national team member Raquel Laneiro.
- On 5 July, Sanja Orozović signed with Breiðablik after playing the previous season with Fjölnir. She previously played for Breiðablik during the 2018–19 season.
- On 26 July, Hildur Björg Kjartansdóttir left Valur and signed with BC Namur-Capitale of the Belgian Women's Basketball League.
- On 31 October, Isabella Ósk Sigurðardóttir left Breiðablik after appearing in 7 games, where she averaged 12.3 points and 13.3 rebounds, and signed with reigning national champions Njarðvík.
- On 15 November, Maja Michalska signed with Fjölnir after having been without a team since the folding of Skallagrímur in December 2021.
- On 21 November, Embla Kristínardóttir signed with Valur.
- On 4 December, Hildur Björg Kjartansdóttir returned to Iceland after starting the season with BC Namur-Capitale in Belgium and signed back with Valur.
- On 14 December, Tinna Guðrún Alexandersdóttir of Haukar became the third Icelandic player to have back-to-back 30 points games in the Úrvalsdeild.
- On 2 January, Keflavík announced that Emelía Ósk Gunnarsdóttir was returning to the team after spending the previous months pursuing an education in Sweden.
- On 13 January, Fjölnir signed former Úrvalsdeild Foreign Player of the Year, Brittanny Dinkins, to replace Taylor Dominique Jones.
- On 25 January, it was reported that Sigrún Sjöfn Ámundadóttir had resigned as player and assistant coach at Fjölnir, following the team's loss to winless ÍR, citing different vision of the team tactics and play with head coach Kristjana Eir Jónsdóttir. Two days later, she signed with Haukar.
- On 8 March, Sigrún Sjöfn Ámundadóttir became the Úrvalsdeild kvenna all-time leader in games played, breaking Birna Valgarðsdóttir's record of 375 games.
- On 15 April, it was announced that Fjölnir's head coach Kristjana Eir Jónsdóttir would not return for the 2023–24 season.
