= Jóhanna Björk Sveinsdóttir =

Icelandic basketball player

Personal information
- Born: 20 October 1989 (age 37) Iceland
- Listed height: 179 cm (5 ft 10 in)

Career information
- Playing career: 2003–2022
- Position: Forward
- Number: 23

Career history
- 2003–2004: Hamar
- 2004–2006: Hamar/Selfoss
- 2006–2009: Hamar
- 2009–2011: KR
- 2011–2012: Breiðablik
- 2012–2014: Haukar
- 2014–2015: Breiðablik
- 2015–2016: Haukar
- 2016–2018: Skallagrímur
- 2018–2019: Stjarnan
- 2020: Valur
- 2021–2022: Stjarnan

Career highlights
- Icelandic league champion (2010); Icelandic Basketball Cup (2014); Icelandic Supercup (2009)

Jóhanna Björk Sveinsdóttir (born 20 October 1989) is an Icelandic former basketball player and a former member of the Icelandic national basketball team.

== Playing career ==
After starting her career with Hamar, Jóhanna won the Icelandic championship in 2010 as a member of KR and the Icelandic Basketball Cup in 2014 with Haukar. After playing for Skallagrímur from 2016 to 2018, where she reached the Cup semi-finals in 2018, she signed with Stjarnan in June 2018.

After a one-year hiatus, Jóhanna signed with Úrvalsdeild club Valur on 7 August 2020.

In August 2021, Jóhanna signed with 1. deild kvenna club Stjarnan.

== Icelandic national team ==
Jóhanna was first selected to the Icelandic national basketball team in 2008. From then to 2018, she played 12 games for the national team.

== Awards and honours ==
=== Titles ===
- Icelandic champion (2010)
- Icelandic Basketball Cup (2014)
- Icelandic Supercup (2009)
- Icelandic Company Cup (2009)
- Icelandic Division I (2006)

=== Honours ===
- Icelandic All-Star game: 2009
