= Margrét Kara Sturludóttir =

Icelandic basketball player (born 1989)

Personal information
- Born: 2 September 1989 (age 37) Iceland
- Listed height: 176 cm (5 ft 9 in)

Career information
- College: Elon (2008)
- Playing career: 2003–2012; 2015–2016; 2019–2020
- Position: Forward

Career history
- 2003–2005: Njarðvík
- 2005–2008: Keflavík
- 2008–2012: KR
- 2015–2016: Stjarnan
- 2019–2020: KR

Career highlights
- Úrvalsdeild Domestic Player of the Year (2011); Úrvalsdeild Young Player of the Year (2007); 3x Úrvalsdeild Domestic All-First Team (2007, 2010, 2011); 2x Icelandic league champion (2008, 2010); Icelandic Basketball Cup (2009); 5x Icelandic Supercup (2005, 2007, 2009, 2010, 2011); 2x Icelandic Company Cup (2007, 2009)

Margrét Kara Sturludóttir (born 2 September 1989) is an Icelandic former basketball player and a former member of the Icelandic national basketball team. She won the Icelandic championship in 2008 and 2010 and was named the Úrvalsdeild Domestic Player of the Year in 2011.

== Playing career ==
Margrét Kara started her senior career with Njarðvík in the Úrvalsdeild kvenna during the 2003–2004 season before joining Keflavík in 2005.

In 2008, Margrét Kara joined Elon University She left the university in December that year and signed with KR in the Úrvalsdeild kvenna. In her first game with KR, she had 17 points, 11 rebounds, 6 assists, 6 blocks and 4 steals in a victory against Snæfell.

She was named the best player of the first half of the 2008–2009 season and helped KR reach the Úrvalsdeild finals where it lost to Haukar 2–3. She was a key player in the KR team that won the 2010 national championship.

In the last game of the 2010–2011 regular season, Margrét Kara struck Haukar's María Lind Sigurðardóttir in the head and was ejected from the game. Due to the disciplinary court taking a week to review the incident, she was able to play in KR's first round playoffs series against Snæfell where she averaged 23.0 points and 5.0 rebounds in the two-game sweep. On March 15, the disciplinary court suspended her for two games. The verdict caused an uproar with Haukar who were unhappy with the short suspension. She missed the first two games of KR's semi-finals playoff series against Keflavík, which the teams split. Keflavík went on to win the next two games after her return, and the series 3–1, advancing to the 2011 Úrvalsdeild finals. After the season Margrét Kara was named the Úrvalsdeild Domestic Player of the Year.

In September 2012, Margrét Kara announced that she would miss the 2012–2013 season due to pregnancy. She didn't return to the league until 2015 when she signed with Stjarnan. She had a strong comeback year with Stjarnan, averaging 10.9 points, 12.5 rebounds and 4.1 assists, and was selected to the national team during the summer of 2016. However, in July 2016, it was confirmed that she would be stepping away from basketball again due to pregnancy.

On 8 September 2019, Benedikt Guðmundsson, the head coach of KR, confirmed that she was training with the club with the possibility signing with the team. She appeared in 22 games during the 2019–2020 season, averaging 5.9 points and 7.0 rebounds per game. On 3 September 2020, KR announced that Margrét had retired from basketball.

== Icelandic national team ==
Margrét Kara played 18 games for the Icelandic U-16 national team from 2004 to 2005 and 18 games for the U-18 team from 2006 to 2007. Between 2006 and 2016, she played 15 games for the Icelandic national basketball team.

== Family ==
Margrét Kara is the daughter of Andrea Gunnarsdóttir and former Icelandic national team player Sturla Örlygsson. She is the sister of former national team player Örlygur Aron Sturluson and Úrvalsdeild karla player Sigurður Dagur Sturluson. Her uncles are former Úrvalsdeild karla players Teitur Örlygsson, who won the Icelandic championship a record 10 times, Gunnar Örn Örlygsson, a former Althing member, and Stefán Örlygsson.
