= Böðvar Guðjónsson =

Icelandic basketball executive and former player (born 1969)

Personal information
- Born: 13 November 1969 (age 56)
- Listed height: 186 cm (6 ft 1 in)

Career history
- 1987–1991: KR

Career highlights
- As player: Icelandic champion (1990); Icelandic Cup winner (1991); As executive: 9× Icelandic Men's Championship (2007, 2009, 2011, 2014–2019); Icelandic Women's Championship (2010); 2× Icelandic Men's Cup (2011, 2016, 2017); Icelandic Women's Cup (2009); 3× Icelandic Men's Super Cup (2007, 2014, 2015); 3× Icelandic Women's Super Cup (2009–2011); 2× Icelandic Men's Company Cup (2008, 2014); Icelandic Women's Company Cup (2009)

Böðvar Eggert Guðjónsson (born 13 November 1969) is an Icelandic basketball executive and former player. He was a board member of Knattspyrnufélag Reykjavíkur's basketball department from 2003 to 2022, most of the time as its chairman. During his time on the board, the KR men's team won nine national championships, including a record six times in a row, and three Icelandic Cups. The women's team won one national championship and one Icelandic Cup.
