= María Lind Sigurðardóttir =

Icelandic basketball player

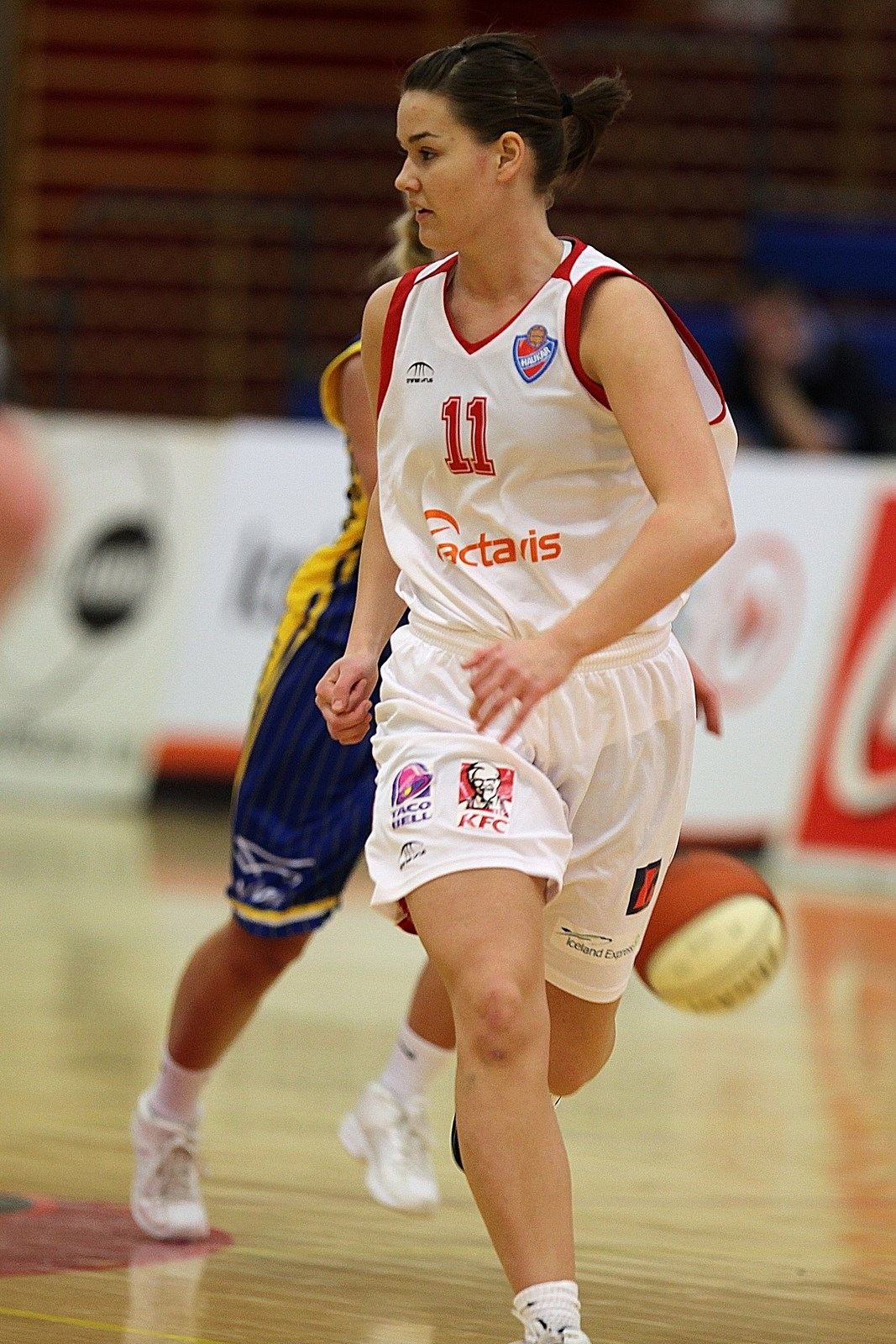
- María Lind in January 2009

Personal information
- Born: August 16, 1989 (age 37) Iceland
- Listed height: 180 cm (5 ft 11 in)

Career information
- Playing career: 2006–2018
- Position: Forward
- Number: 7

Career history
- 2006: Haukar
- 2007–2013: Haukar
- 2014–2016: Haukar
- 2016–2018: Stjarnan

Career highlights
- Icelandic Cup Finals MVP (2010); Icelandic league champion (2009); Icelandic Basketball Cup (2010); 2× Icelandic Company Cup (2011, 2015)

María Lind Sigurðardóttir (born 16 August 1989) is a former Icelandic basketball player. She spent the majority of her career with Haukar, winning the national championship in 2009 and the Icelandic Basketball Cup in 2010, where she was also named Cup Finals MVP. During a game between Haukar and KR in March 2011, María was struck in the face with a closed fist by KR's Margrét Kara Sturludóttir. Consequently, Margrét Kara received a two-game suspension from the Icelandic Basketball Association, a decision that was criticized by both Haukar and María Lind as being too lenient. In 2016, María transferred to Stjarnan where she played her final two seasons before retiring.

== Personal life ==
María graduated from Kvennaskólinn í Reykjavík at the top of her class in 2009.
