= 2016–2017 Icelandic Women's Basketball Cup =

2016–2017 Bikarkeppni Kvenna
Tournament details
- Arena: Laugardalshöll; Reykjavík
- Dates: 8–11 February 2017

Final positions
- Champions: Keflavík
- Runners-up: Skallagrímur

Awards and statistics
- MVP: (United States) Ariana Moorer
- Top scorer(s): (United States) Aaryn Ellenberg-Wiley

The 2016–2017 Bikarkeppni kvenna was the 43rd edition of the Icelandic Women's Basketball Cup, won by Keflavík against Skallagrímur. The competition was managed by the Icelandic Basketball Federation and the final four was held in Reykjavík, in the Laugardalshöll in February 2018. Ariana Moorer was named the Cup Finals MVP after scoring 29 points and grabbing 19 rebounds.

== Participating teams ==
Twelve teams signed up for the Cup tournament.

== Bracket ==
Quarterfinals
14 January
Grindavík	60
Keflavík	92
15 January
Breiðablik	63
Haukar	71
16 January
Skallagrímur	78
KR	42
15 January
Snæfell	68
Stjarnan	63

Semifinals
8 February
Keflavík	82
Haukar	67
8 February
Skallagrímur	70
Snæfell	68

Final
11 February
Keflavík	65
Skallagrímur	62

== Cup Finals MVP ==
Pos.	Player	Team
PG	(United States) Ariana Moorer	Keflavík
