= Bríet Sif Hinriksdóttir =

Icelandic basketball player (born 1996)

Personal information
- Born: 14 August 1996 (age 30) Iceland
- Listed height: 174 cm (5 ft 9 in)

Career information
- Playing career: 2011–2026
- Position: Shooting guard

Career history
- 2011-2016: Keflavík
- 2016-2019: Stjarnan
- 2019-2020: Grindavík
- 2020-2022: Haukar
- 2022-2023: Njarðvík
- 2024-2026: Keflavík

Career highlights
- Úrvalsdeild Domestic All-First Team (2019); Icelandic champion (2013); 4× Icelandic Cup (2013, 2021, 2022, 2026); 3× Icelandic Super Cup (2013, 2021, 2022); Icelandic Company Cup (2014)

Career Úrvalsdeild kvenna statistics
- Points: 2,624 (7.8 ppg)
- Rebounds: 854 (2,4 rpg)
- Assists: 442 (1.3 rpg)

Bríet Sif Hinriksdóttir (born 14 August 1996) is an Icelandic former basketball player. During her career, she won the Icelandic championship once and the Icelandic Cup four times. In 2019, she was named to the Úrvalsdeild Domestic All-First Team.

== Playing career ==
Bríet Sif came through the youth ranks of Keflavík and played her first games with the senior team during the 2011–2012 season.

During the 2012–2013 season, she helped Keflavík win both the Icelandic Cup and the national championship. She started the following season well, scoring 10 points in Keflavík's 77–74 victory against Valur in the Icelandic Super Cup on 13 October 2013.

During the 2014–2015 season, Bríet helped Keflavík to the second best record in the league. Keflavík swept Haukar in the semi-finals in the playoffs and met defending champions Snæfell in the finals where they lost 0–3.

In 2016, she joined Stjarnan in the Úrvalsdeild and during her first season with the club, she averaged 8.4 points and 3.3 rebounds per game. She continued to improve during her second season with Stjarnan, upping her averaged to 13.0 and 3.9 rebounds while shooting 34.1% from the three point range. In January 2019, Bríet Sif was named to the Úrvalsdeild Team of the first half of the 2018–2019 season. On 5 January 2019, she scored a season high 37 points, making 9 of 14 three point shots, in a victory against Breiðablik. She helped Stjarnan to the playoffs where it lost to Keflavík in the semi-finals, and to the Cup Finals, where it lost to Valur. For the season she averaged 13.4 points 4.3 rebounds per game and was named to the Úrvalsdeild Domestic All-First Team.

On 9 July 2019, Bríet signed with newly promoted Grindavík. On 4 January 2020, she scored a career high 39 points in a victory against Breiðablik. For the season she averaged 12.6 points and 4.6 rebounds per game but Grindavík was relegated after the season ended prematurely due to the coronavirus pandemic in Iceland.

On 9 July 2020, Bríet Sif signed with Úrvalsdeild club Haukar. On 10 March 2021, she scored a season high 34 points and made 8 out of 14 three point shots in a 120–77 victory against KR. In 27 regular season and playoff games, she averaged 10.5 points per game, helping Haukar to the Úrvalsdeild finals where they lost to Valur in three games.

On 18 September 2021, Bríet won the Icelandic Cup with Haukar after a 94–89 victory against Fjölnir in the Cup finals. On 19 March 2022, she won the Icelandic Cup again after Haukar defeated Breiðablik in the 2022 Cup Finals.

In June 2022, Bríet Sif signed with Njarðvík. On 18 September, she won the Super Cup with Njarðvík after winning her former team, Haukar, 94–87.

After sitting out the 2023–2024 season, she joined Keflavík ahead of the 2024–2025 season. In 2026, she won the Icelandic Cup for the fourth time. After two seasons with Keflavík, she announced her retirement in June 2026.

== Icelandic national team ==
Bríet Sif played her first game for the Icelandic national basketball team in 2018 when the team faced Slovakia in the EuroCup. She played a total of 8 games for Iceland.

== Personal life ==
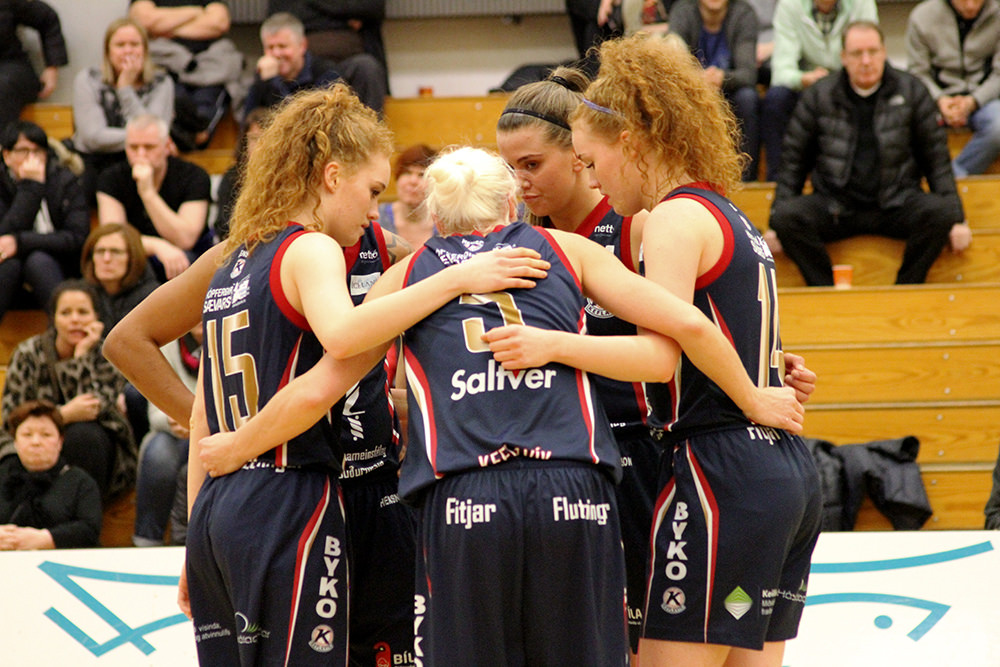
Bríet Sif along with her twin sister Sara Rún during the 2014-2015 Úrvalsdeild kvenna season.

Bríet's twin sister is basketball player Sara Rún Hinriksdóttir.

== Awards, titles and accomplishments ==
=== Titles ===
- Icelandic champion: 2013
- Icelandic Basketball Cup: 2013
- Icelandic Supercup: 2013
- Icelandic Company Cup: 2014
