= Úrvalsdeild Women's Young Player of the Year =

The Women's Young Player of the Year is an annual Úrvalsdeild kvenna honor bestowed on the best young player in the league following every season.

== All-time award winners ==
The following is a list of the all-time Úrvalsdeild Women's Young Player of the Year winners.

Season	Player	Team
1993-1994	(Iceland) Gréta María Grétarsdóttir	ÍR
1994-1995	(Iceland) Erla Reynisdóttir	Keflavík
1995–1996	(Iceland) Sóley Sigurþórsdóttir	ÍA
1996–1997	(Iceland) Þórunn Bjarnadóttir	ÍR
1997–1998	(Iceland) Guðrún A. Sigurðardóttir	ÍR
1998–1999	(Iceland) Hildur Sigurðardóttir	ÍR
1999–2000	(Iceland) Birna Eiríksdóttir	Tindastóll
2000-2001	(Iceland) Svava Ósk Stefánsdóttir	Keflavík
2001-2002	(Iceland) Sara Pálmadóttir	KFÍ
2002-2003	(Iceland) Helena Sverrisdóttir	Haukar
2003-2004	(Iceland) María Ben Erlingsdóttir	Keflavík
2004-2005	(Iceland) Bryndís Guðmundsdóttir	Keflavík
2005-2006	(Iceland) María Ben Erlingsdóttir (2x)	Keflavík
2006-2007	(Iceland) Margrét Kara Sturludóttir	Keflavík
2007-2008	(Iceland) Ragna Margrét Brynjarsdóttir	Haukar
2008-2009	(Iceland) Ragna Margrét Brynjarsdóttir (2x)	Haukar
2009-2010	(Iceland) Guðbjörg Sverrisdóttir	Hamar
2010-2011	(Iceland) Bergþóra Tómasdóttir	Fjölnir
2011-2012	(Iceland) Margrét Rósa Hálfdánardóttir	Haukar
2012-2013	(Iceland) Sara Rún Hinriksdóttir	Keflavík
2013-2014	(Iceland) Marín Laufey Davíðsdóttir	Hamar
2014-2015	(Iceland) Sara Rún Hinriksdóttir (2x)	Keflavík
2015-2016	(Iceland) Thelma Dís Ágústsdóttir	Keflavík
2016-2017	(Iceland) Birna Valgerður Benónýsdóttir	Keflavík
2017-2018	(Iceland) Dagbjört Dögg Karlsdóttir	Valur
2018-2019	(Iceland) Birna Valgerður Benónýsdóttir (2x)	Keflavík
2019–2020	None selected after season was canceled due to the coronavirus pandemic in Iceland	
2020–2021	(Iceland) Elísabeth Ýr Ægisdóttir	Haukar
2021–2022	(Iceland) Tinna Guðrún Alexandersdóttir	Haukar
2022–2023	(Iceland) Tinna Guðrún Alexandersdóttir	Haukar
2023–2024	(Iceland) Kolbrún María Ármannsdóttir	Stjarnan
2024–2025	(Iceland) Kolbrún María Ármannsdóttir	Stjarnan
2025–2026	(Iceland) Rebekka Rut Steingrímsdóttir	KR
