= Sara Rún Hinriksdóttir =

Icelandic basketball player (born 1996)

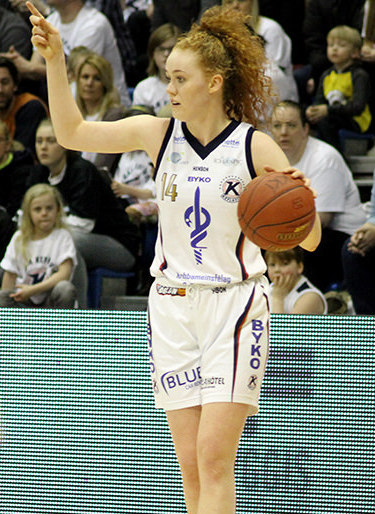
- Sara Rún during the 2015 Icelandic basketball cup finals.

KR
- Position: Forward
- League: Úrvalsdeild kvenna

Personal information
- Born: 14 August 1996 (age 30) Reykjavík, Iceland
- Listed height: 185 cm (6 ft 1 in)

Career information
- College: Canisius (2015–2019)
- Playing career: 2011–present
- Number: 4, 14

Career history
- 2011–2015: Keflavík
- 2019: Keflavík
- 2019–2021: Leicester Riders
- 2021: Haukar
- 2021–2022: CS Phoenix Constanța
- 2022–2023: Faenza Basket Project
- 2023–2024: AE Sedis Bàsquet
- 2024–2026: Keflavík
- 2026–present: KR

Career highlights
- 5× Icelandic Female Basketball Player of the Year (2020–2023, 2025); ÚrvalsdeildDomestic Player of the Year (2021); Úrvalsdeild Finals MVP (2024); 3× Úrvalsdeild Domestic All-First Team (2015, 2021, 2025); 2× Icelandic champion (2013, 2024); 2× Icelandic Basketball Cup (2013, 2024); Icelandic Basketball Super Cup (2013); WBBL Cup (2021); WBBL Trophy (2020); WBBL Trophy MVP (2020)
Medals
Women's basketball
Representing Iceland
Games of the Small States of Europe
Silver medal – second place	2013 Luxembourg	National Team
Silver medal – second place	2015 Iceland	National Team
Silver medal – second place	2017 San Marino	National Team
Silver medal – second place	2019 Bar	Team

Sara Rún Hinriksdóttir (born 14 August 1996) is an Icelandic basketball player who currently plays for KR and the Icelandic national basketball team. She played college basketball for Canisius in the Metro Atlantic Athletic Conference. She is a five time Icelandic Female Basketball Player of the Year.

Sara started her career with her hometown team of Keflavík where she won the Icelandic championship and Icelandic Cup in 2013. After her college career, she joined Leicester Riders where she won the WBBL Trophy in 2020, while also being named the WBBL Trophy MVP, and the WBBL Cup in 2021.

== Playing career ==
=== Early years ===
Born in Reykjavík, Sara started her senior career with Keflavík in 2011. She was named to the Úrvalsdeild All-first team for the first half of the 2012–2013 season, at the age of 16, after averaging 15 points and 9 rebounds in the first fourteen games. In 2013, she helped Keflavík win both the Icelandic Basketball Cup and the national championship.

During the 2014–2015 season, Sara helped Keflavík to the second best record in the league and was named to the Úrvalsdeild All-first team for the second half of the season. Keflavík swept Haukar in the semi-finals in the playoffs and met defending champions Snæfell in the finals. On April 28, she became the second youngest player to score 30 or more points in a Finals game when she scored 31 points in a losing effort against Snæfell in the third and final game of the series. For the playoffs, Sara averaged 18.8 points og 7.5 rebounds.

=== Move to college ===
After the finals, Sara joined Canisius College. On 30 November 2015 she was named the MAAC Rookie of the Week.

On 22 January 2018, Sara was named the MAAC player of the week for the second time in her career after averaging 23 points and 7.5 rebounds in the Golden Griffins two victories during the week.

On 24 February 2018, she scored her 1,000 college career point in a game against Siena College.

On 11 December 2018, she was named the MAAC player of the week after averaging 17.0 points and 12.2 rebounds during the week. On 25 February 2019, she was again named the MAAC player of the week after she averaged 21.0 points, 8.5 rebounds and 4.0 assists.

=== Return to Keflavík ===
On 21 February 2019, Keflavík announced that Sara would join the team in March after concluding her season with Canisius. She helped Keflavík to the Úrvalsdeild finals where they lost to Valur. In 11 regular season and playoffs games, Sara averaged 16.7 points, 7.1 rebounds and 3.3 assists per game.

=== Leicester Riders ===
In September 2019, Sara signed with Leicester Riders of the Women's British Basketball League while also studying for her Master's degree at Loughborough University.

On 15 March 2020, Sara was named MVP after leading the Riders to their third straight WBBL Trophy with a 70–66 victory against Durham Palatinates.

On 20 December 2020, Sara was named the Icelandic Female Basketball Player of the Year.

On 12 February 2021, Sara helped the riders to win the WBBL Cup for the first time.

=== Haukar ===
On 25 February 2021, Sara Rún returned to Iceland and signed with Haukar, rejoining with her twin sister Bríet Sif. On 10 March 2021, the sisters combined to score 62 points and make 12 three pointers in a 120–77 victory against KR. Following the season, she was named the Úrvalsdeild Domestic Player of the Year after leading Haukar to the Úrvalsdeild finals.

=== Phoenix Constanța ===
In August 2021, Sara Rún signed with CS Phoenix Constanța of the Romanian Liga Națională.

On 16 December 2021, it was announced that she had been named the Icelandic Female Basketball Player of the Year for the second year in a row.

=== Faenza Basket Project ===
In June 2022, Sara signed with Faenza Basket Project of the Italian Lega Basket Femminile. In December 2022, she was named the Icelandic Female Basketball Player of the Year for the third straight year.

=== AE Sedis Bàsquet ===
In July 2023, Sara signed with AE Sedis Bàsquet of the Spanish Liga Femenina de Baloncesto.

In December 2023, she was named the Icelandic Female Basketball Player of the Year for the fourth straight year.

In January 2024, she left the club.

=== Back to Iceland and Keflavík ===
On 17 January, Sara signed with Keflavík. On 22 May 2024, she won the national championship with Keflavík and was named the Finals MVP.

In December 2025, she was named the Icelandic Female Basketball Player of the Year for the fifth time. For the 2025–26 season, she averaged 20.6 points and was named to the Domestic All-first team.

=== KR ===
In June 2026, Sara signed with KR.

== Icelandic national team ==
Sara played her first game for the Icelandic national basketball team in 2013 On 14 November 2020, she became the third player to break the 30 point barrier for the national team when she scored 31 points in a loss against Bulgaria in the EuroBasket Women 2021 qualification. On 27 November 2022, she scored 33 points in victory against Romania.

== Personal life ==
Sara's twin sister, Bríet Sif Hinriksdóttir, is a basketball player in the Úrvalsdeild kvenna and a member of the Icelandic national team.

== Statistics ==
=== College statistics ===
Legend
GP	Games played	GS	Games started	MPG	Minutes per game
FG%	Field goal percentage	3P%	3-point field goal percentage	FT%	Free throw percentage
RPG	Rebounds per game	APG	Assists per game	SPG	Steals per game
BPG	Blocks per game	PPG	Points per game	**Bold**	Career high

Year	Team	GP	Points	FG%	3P%	FT%	RPG	APG	SPG	BPG	PPG
2015-16	Canisius	25	132	39.0%	28.6%	71.8%	2.4	0.5	0.3	0.3	5.3
2016-17	Canisius	**31**	**453**	**45.8%**	**31.7%**	71.3%	5.8	2.0	0.5	0.6	14.6
2017-18	Canisius	30	448	40.8%	27.9%	**77.6%**	5.6	**2.3**	0.8	0.6	**14.9**
2018-19	Canisius	30	386	39.5%	27.2%	74.6%	**8.1**	1.9	**1.1**	**0.7**	12.9
Career		116	1419	41.7%	28.9%	74.2%	5.6	1.7	0.7	0.6	12.2

== Awards, titles and accomplishments ==
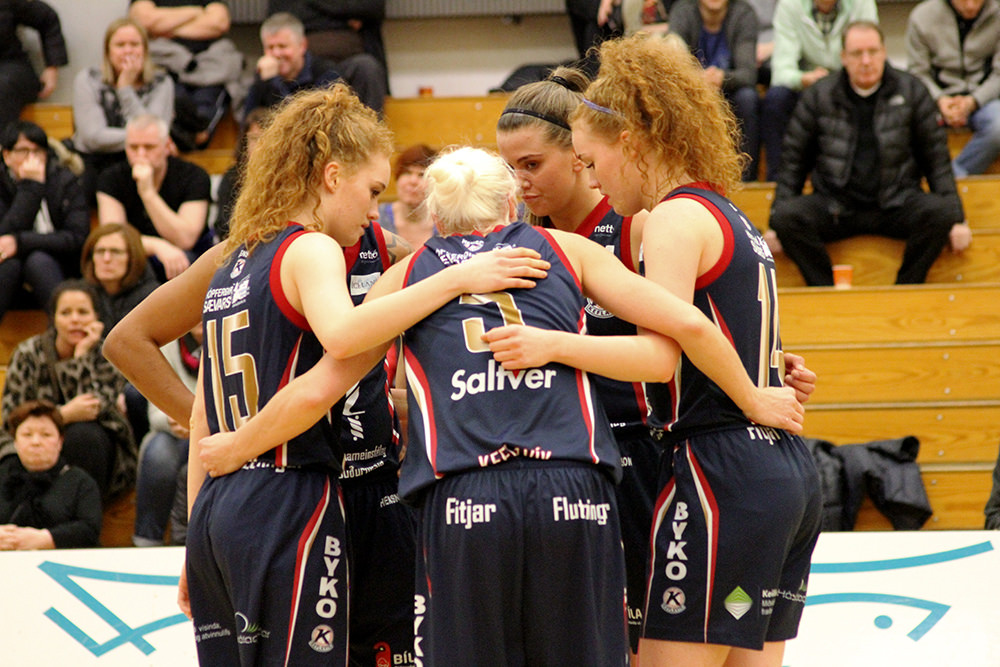
Sara Rún along with her twin sister Bríet Sif during the 2014-2015 Úrvalsdeild kvenna season.

=== Individual awards ===
- Icelandic Female Basketball Player of the Year (3): 2020, 2021, 2022
- Úrvalsdeild Domestic Player of the Year: 2021
- Úrvalsdeild Domestic All-First Team (2): 2015, 2021
- Úrvalsdeild Young Player of the Year (2): 2013, 2015
- WBBL Trophy MVP: 2020

=== Titles ===
- Icelandic champion: 2013
- Icelandic Basketball Cup (2): 2013, 2024
- Icelandic Supercup: 2013
- Icelandic Company Cup: 2014
- WBBL Trophy: 2020
- WBBL Cup: 2021
