= Slavica Dimovska =

Macedonian basketball player

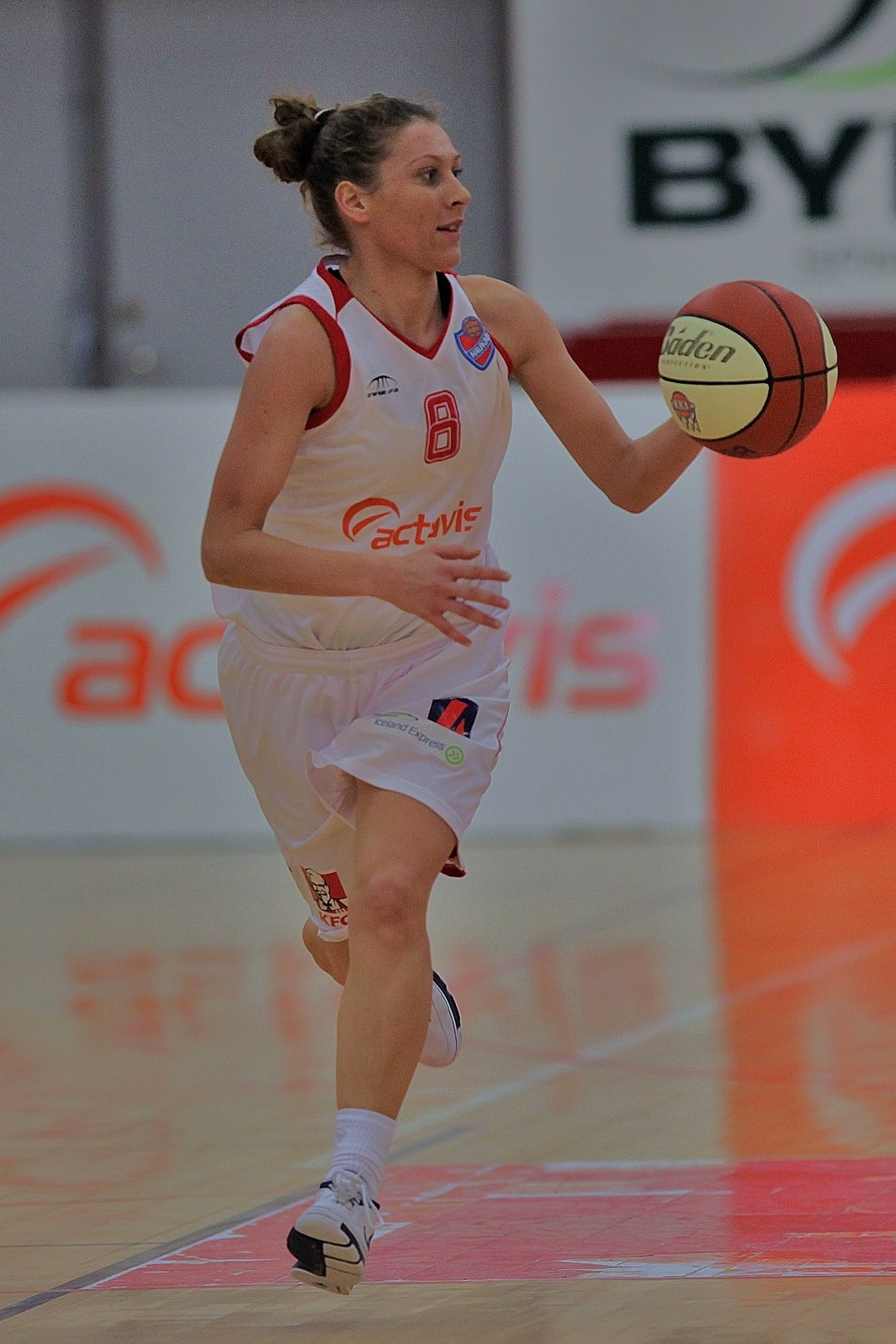
- Dimovska with Haukar.

Personal information
- Born: 29 July 1985 (age 41)
- Listed height: 177 cm (5 ft 10 in)
- Position: Point guard

Career history
- 2005–2007: Triglias
- 2007–2008: Fjölnir
- 2008–2009: Haukar
- 2009–2010: Vardar Mladinec
- 2010–2011: Hamar
- 2011–201?: Vigor Skopje
- 2017–2019: Vardar Mladinec

Career highlights
- Macedonian Women's Basketball Player of the Year (2010); Macedonian League Playoffs MVP (2019); Úrvalsdeild Foreign Player of the Year (2009); Úrvalsdeild Playoffs MVP (2009); 3x Macedonian champion (2010, 2012, 2019); 2x Macedonian Cup (2012, 2019); Icelandic champion (2009)

Slavica Nakov-Dimovska (born 29 July 1985) is a Macedonian basketball player and a former member of the Macedonian national basketball team. She won the Icelandic championship with Haukar in 2009 when she was named the Úrvalsdeild Foreign Player of the Year and the Úrvalsdeild Playoffs MVP. In 2010, she was named the Macedonian Women's Basketball Player of the Year.

== Career ==
From 2005 to 2007, Dimovska played for Triglias in Greece. During the 2006–2007 season, she finished 5th in scoring in the league with 22.6 points per game.

In 2007, Dimovska joined Úrvalsdeild kvenna club Fjölnir. For the season she averaged 24.1 points, 7.3 rebounds and 4.3 assists.

Following the season, Dimovska signed with rival Úrvalsdeild club Haukar. On 19 November 2008, she scored a season high 38 points, including the game winning three pointer at the buzzer, against Hamar. On 11 January 2009, she scored 37 points in an unexpected 65-93 loss against KR in the Icelandic Cup.

Dimovska spent the 2009-10 season with Vardar Mladinec where she led the team to the Macedonian championship.

In 2010, she returned to Iceland and signed with Hamar.

In 2012, she won the Macedonian championship and Macedonian Cup with Vigor Skopje.

In 2019, she led Vardar Mladinec to the Macedonian championship and the Macedonian Cup. For her efforts in the playoffs, she was named the Playoffs MVP.
