= 2022–23 Icelandic Women's Basketball Cup =

2022–2023 Bikarkeppni Kvenna
Tournament details
- Arena: Laugardalshöll (Final four); Reykjavík, Iceland
- Dates: 29 October 2022 – 14 January 2023

Final positions
- Champions: Haukar
- Runners-up: Keflavík

Awards and statistics
- MVP: (Iceland) Sólrún Inga Gísladóttir
- Top scorer(s): (United States) Daniela Wallen

The 2022–2023 Bikarkeppni kvenna, referred to as VÍS bikarinn for sponsorship reasons, was the 49th edition of the Icelandic Women's Basketball Cup, won by Haukar against Keflavík. The competition was managed by the Icelandic Basketball Association (KKÍ) and the cup final was played in Laugardalshöll, Reykjavík, and broadcast live on RÚV. Sólrún Inga Gísladóttir was named the Cup Finals MVP after turning in 20 points, 7 rebounds and 7 assists.

== Participating teams ==
16 teams signed up for the Cup tournament.

== Final four ==
Semifinals
10 January
Haukar	98
Snæfell	62
10 January
Stjarnan	73
Keflavík	100

Final
14 January
Haukar	94
Keflavík	66

== Cup Finals MVP ==
Pos.	Player	Team
Forward	(Iceland) Sólrún Inga Gísladóttir	Haukar
