= Ívar Ásgrímsson =

Icelandic basketball player and coach

Personal information
- Born: 11 April 1965 (age 61)

Career information
- Playing career: 1983–2004
- Coaching career: 1987–present

Career history

Playing
- 1983–1992: Haukar
- 1992–1993: Snæfell
- 1993-1994: ÍA
- 1995: Breiðablik
- 1995-1997: Haukar
- 1997-1999: ÍS
- 2001-2004: ÍS

Coaching
- 1987–1988: Haukar (women's)
- 1989–1991: Haukar (women's)
- 1992–1993: Snæfell (men's)
- 1993-1994: ÍA (men's)
- 1998-1999: ÍS (women's)
- 1999–2001: Haukar (men's)
- 2001-2004: ÍS (women's)
- 2003-2005: Iceland (women's)
- 2005-2007: ÍS (women's)
- 2011: Haukar (men's)
- 2013–2019: Haukar (men's)
- 2014–2018: Iceland (women's)
- 2014–2015: Haukar (women's)
- 2019–2022: Breiðablik (women's)
- 2022–2023: Breiðablik (men's, assistant)
- 2023–2024: Breiðablik (men's)

Career highlights
- As player: Icelandic champion (1988); 3× Icelandic Basketball Cup (1985, 1986, 1996); As coach: Icelandic Supercup (1998); 2x Icelandic Basketball Cup (2003, 2006)
Medals
Head Coach for Iceland
women's national basketball team
Games of the Small States of Europe
Silver medal – second place	2005 Andorra	Team
Silver medal – second place	2015 Iceland	Team
Silver medal – second place	2017 San Marino	Team

Ívar Ásgrímsson (born 11 April 1965) is an Icelandic basketball coach and the former head coach of the Icelandic women's national basketball team. He led Haukar to the national men's finals in 2016 where they lost to KR.

== Playing career ==
=== Club career ===
Ívar played for 14 seasons in the Icelandic Úrvalsdeild, 11 of them with Haukar where he won the Icelandic Basketball Cup in 1985, 1986 and 1996. He won the national championship in 1988 with Haukar after beating Njarðvík in the finals. He scored 14 points in the third and deciding game of the series, and sent it into a second overtime after scoring two free throws with 10 seconds left.

=== Icelandic national team ===
Between 1986 and 1991, Ívar played 15 games for the Icelandic national basketball team.

== Coaching career ==
=== Club career ===
After coaching the Haukar team since 2011, Ívar announced in March 2019 that he would leave the team and the end of the season.

On 26 May 2019, Ívar was hired as the head coach of 1. deild kvenna club Breiðablik.

In April 2023, Ívar was hired as the head coach of Breiðablik men's team, replacing Pétur Ingvarsson, after serving as an assistant coach with the team the previous season.

=== National team career ===
Ívar was hired as the head coach of the Icelandic women's national basketball team for two years in 2004. In 2014 he was rehired as the head coach. He is the longest tenured head coach in Iceland's women's team history, having coached the team for 7 years. After the team's last game in the EuroBasket Women 2019 qualification, Ívar announced that it was his last game with the team as he would not seek a renewal of his contract.

==== National team record ====
Year	Games	Wins	Losses	%
2004	14	7	7	50%
2005	6	4	2	67%
2014	6	3	3	50%
2015	8	3	5	38%
2016	6	3	3	50%
2017	9	3	6	33%
2018	4	0	4	0%
Career	53	23	30	43%
