= Sólrún Inga Gísladóttir =

Icelandic basketball player (born 1996)

Haukar
- League: Úrvalsdeild kvenna

Personal information
- Born: 25 March 1996 (age 30)
- Listed height: 180 cm (5 ft 11 in)

Career information
- College: Coastal Georgia (2017–2021)
- Playing career: 2011–present
- Position: Guard

Career history
- 2011–2013: Haukar
- 2014–2017: Haukar
- 2021–present: Haukar

Career highlights
- Icelandic Cup Finals MVP (2023); 3× Icelandic Basketball Cup (2021–2023); 2× Icelandic Super Cup (2021, 2023); 2× Icelandic Company Cup (2011, 2015); 4× Second-team All-Sun Conference (2018–2021)

Sólrún Inga Gísladóttir (born 25 March 1996) is an Icelandic basketball player for Haukar of the Icelandic Úrvalsdeild kvenna. She played college basketball for Coastal Georgia from 2017 to 2021, where she was named to the All-Sun Conference Second Team all four seasons. In Iceland, she has spent her entire club career with Haukar, where she has won the Icelandic Basketball Cup for three straight years and was named the Cup Finals MVP in 2023.

== Playing career ==
Sólrún started her senior team career with Haukar in 2011. She won the Icelandic Company Cup with the club in 2011 and 2015.

In 2017, she left for the United States where she played college basketball for Coastal Georgia until 2021. During her stay with Coastal Georgia, she was named to the All-Sun Conference Second Team all four seasons. In January 2018, Sólrún broke Coastal Georgia's single game record with most three pointers in a game when she made nine three pointers against Keiser University. She had set the previous record in December 2017, when she made 8 three point shots in a single game. She also became the first player in the Sun Conference history to make nine three pointers in one game.

In June 2021, Sólrún signed with her hometown team of Haukar. On 18 September 2021, she won the Icelandic Cup with Haukar after a 94–89 victory against Fjölnir in the Cup finals. On 19 March 2022, she won the Icelandic Cup again after Haukar defeated Breiðablik in the 2022 Cup Finals.

On 30 October 2022, Sólrún scored 31 points, making 7 of 8 three points shots, in a win against Hamar/Þór in the Icelandic Cup. On 14 January 2023, Sólrún was named the Icelandic Cup Finals MVP after making five out of six three point shots and posting 20 points, 7 rebounds and 7 assists in Haukar's 94–66 win against Keflavík. For the season, she averaged 10.5 points in 33 regular season and playoff games while making 35.9% of her three point shots.

On 20 September 2023, she scored 8 points in Haukar's 78–77 win against Valur in the Icelandic Super Cup.
