= Birna Valgerður Benónýsdóttir =

Icelandic basketball player (born 2000)

Personal information
- Born: 23 September 2000 (age 26) Keflavík, Iceland
- Listed height: 187 cm (6 ft 2 in)

Career information
- College: Arizona (2019–2020); Binghamton (2020–2022)
- Playing career: 2016–2026
- Position: Center

Career history
- 2016–2019: Keflavík
- 2022–2026: Keflavík

Career highlights
- 2× Icelandic champion (2017, 2024); 3× Icelandic Cup (2017, 2018, 2024); 2× Icelandic Super Cup (2018, 2019); Úrvalsdeild Domestic Player of the Year (2024); 2× Úrvalsdeild Domestic All-First Team (2023, 2024); 2× Úrvalsdeild Young Player of the Year (2017, 2019)

Birna Valgerður Benónýsdóttir (23 September 2000) is an Icelandic former basketball player. She won the Icelandic championship in 2017 and 2024 with Keflavík and was named the Úrvalsdeild Domestic Player of the Year. Birna spent her whole club career with Keflavík but also played college basketball for the Arizona Wildcats and the Binghamton Bearcats.

Birna represented Iceland at the international stage, appearing in 12 games for the senior national team.

During the 2024 Úrvalsdeild playoffs, she tore a cruciate ligament in her knee the would require three surgeries. In February 2026, she announced her retirement from basketball due to the injury after missing the previous one and a half season.
