= Þóra Steffensen =

Icelandic physician, forensic pathologist and basketball player

- Born: 9 December 1962 (age 63)
- Occupations: Physician and forensic pathologist
- Basketball career

Personal information
- Listed height: 184 cm (6 ft 0 in)
- Position: Center

Career history
- 1981–1985: Íþróttafélag Reykjavíkur
- 1985–198?: Íþróttafélag stúdenta

Þóra Steinunn Steffensen (born 9 December 1962) is an Icelandic physician and forensic pathologist. She played basketball for the Íþróttafélag Reykjavíkur and the Íþróttafélag stúdenta and was for a time the tallest player in the women's top division as well as sitting on the board of the Icelandic Basketball Association.
