= 2020–21 Icelandic Women's Basketball Cup =

2020–2021 Bikarkeppni Kvenna
Tournament details
- Arena: Smárinn (cup final); Kópavogur, Iceland
- Dates: 5 September – 18 September 2021

Final positions
- Champions: Haukar
- Runners-up: Fjölnir

Awards and statistics
- MVP: (Iceland) Helena Sverrisdóttir

The 2020–2021 Bikarkeppni kvenna, referred to as VÍS bikarinn for sponsorship reasons, was the 47th edition of the Icelandic Women's Basketball Cup, won by Haukar against Fjölnir. The competition was managed by the Icelandic Basketball Association (KKÍ) and the cup final was played in Smárinn, Kópavogur, and broadcast live on RÚV. Helena Sverrisdóttir was named the Cup Finals MVP after turning in 26 points, 9 rebounds and 9 assists.

== Participating teams ==
Initially 18 teams signed up for the Cup tournament. In October 2020, the tournament was postponed, first for two weeks and later indefinitely due to another Coronavirus outbreak in Iceland. On 28 January 2021, KKÍ announced that the competition would begin on 22 April and end on 1 May, featuring 16 teams and would be sponsored by the insurance company VÍS. It was later postponed to August 2021 with the first game played on 5 September.

== Final four ==
Semifinals
15 September
Fjölnir	65
Njarðvík	60
15 September
Valur	59
Haukar	68

Final
18 September
Fjölnir	89
Haukar	94

== Cup Finals MVP ==
Pos.	Player	Team
Forward	(Iceland) Helena Sverrisdóttir	Haukar
