= Lele Hardy =

American basketball player (born 1988)

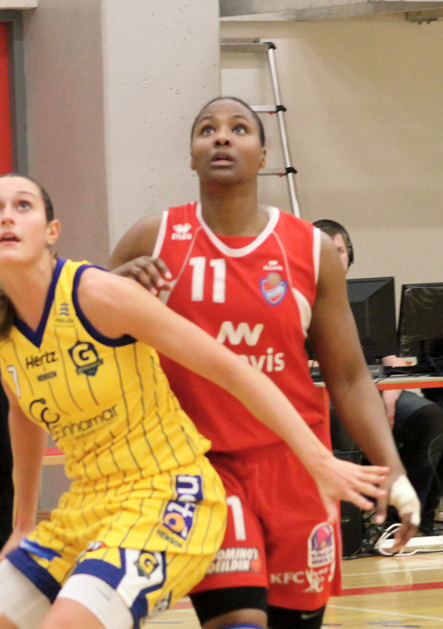
- Hardy with Haukar in 2014

Personal information
- Born: September 6, 1988 (age 38) Spartanburg, South Carolina, U.S.
- Listed height: 6 ft 0 in (1.83 m)

Career information
- High school: Spartanburg (Spartanburg, South Carolina)
- College: Clemson (2006–2010)
- Playing career: 2010–2019
- Position: Forward
- Number: 1, 11

Career history

Playing
- 2010–2011: Nottingham Wildcats
- 2011–2013: Njarðvík
- 2013–2015: Haukar
- 2015–2017: Vimpelin Veto
- 2017–2018: Tapiolan Honka
- 2018–2019: Haukar

Coaching
- 2012–2013: Njarðvík
- 2018–2019: Haukar (assistant)

Career highlights
- As player: 3× Úrvalsdeild Foreign Player of the Year (2012–2014); Úrvalsdeild Playoffs MVP (2012); Icelandic Cup Finals MVP (2014); Icelandic champion (2012); 2× Icelandic Basketball Cup (2012, 2014); Úrvalsdeild scoring champion (2014); 4× Úrvalsdeild rebounding leader (2012–2015); Naisten Korisliiga scoring champion (2016); 2× Icelandic All-Star (2013, 2014); Icelandic All-Star MVP (2013); 2x ACC All-Defensive Team (2009, 2010); ACC All-Freshman Team (2007)

Wilesia "Lele" Hardy (born September 6, 1988) is an American former professional basketball player. She won the Icelandic championship with Njarðvík in 2012, when she was also named Úrvalsdeild Playoffs MVP, and was named the Úrvalsdeild Foreign Player of the Year three years in a row, from 2012 to 2014. She won the Icelandic Basketball Cup with Njarðvík in 2012 and in 2014 with Haukar while also being named the Cup Finals MVP.

Hardy played three seasons in the Naisten Korisliiga, leading the league in scoring in 2016.

== Professional career ==
=== England ===
Hardy's first professional stop was with the Nottingham Wildcats of the then top-tier English Women's Basketball League. She helped the club reach the English EBL semifinals and for the season she averaged 20,1 points and 10,3 rebounds.

=== Iceland ===
Hardy won the Icelandic national championship in 2012 with Njarðvík, while also being named the playoffs MVP, and the Icelandic cup two times; with Njarðvík in 2012 and Haukar in 2014. She led the league in rebounds for four straight years (2012–2015) while leading the league in scoring for the 2013–2014 season. She finished second in scoring in 2015 and third in 2012 and 2013.

=== Finland ===
In August 2015, Hardy signed with Vimpelin Veto in the Finnish Naisten Korisliiga league. In her first season she led the league in scoring with an average of 22,6 points per game.

She spent the 2017–2018 season with Tapiolan Honka, helping the club finish second in the league.

=== Return to Iceland ===
On June 30, 2018, Hardy returned to Iceland and signed with Haukar as a player and assistant coach to Ólöf Helga Pálsdóttir. In her first game back, Haukar lost in the Super Cup to Keflavík, 77–83, despite Hardy's 23 points. On 20 February 2019, Haukar announced that Hardy would not finish the season with the team but would continue in her capacity as a coach for the junior teams. In 20 games she averaged 21.4 points, 14.4 rebounds and 5.7 assists.

== Career statistics ==
=== College ===
Lele Hardy Statistics at Clemson University
Year	G	FG	FGA	PCT	3FG	3FGA	PCT	FT	FTA	PCT	REB	AVG	A	TO	B	S	MIN	PTS	AVG
2006–07	30	130	324	0.401	26	77	0.337	63	111	0.568	206	6.9	75	–	13	98	–	349	11.6
2007–08	31	103	304	0.339	10	60	0.167	56	83	0.675	220	7.1	105	–	13	83	–	272	8.8
2008–09	31	186	438	0.425	40	119	0.336	91	130	0.700	261	8.4	94	–	12	106	–	503	16.2
2009–10	31	158	468	0.338	40	152	0.263	91	141	0.645	246	7.9	66	–	19	111	–	447	14.4
Totals	123	577	1534	0.376	116	408	0.284	301	465	0.647	933	7.6	340	–	57	398	–	1571	12.8

=== Naisten Korisliiga ===
Year	Team	GP	GS	MPG	FG%	3P%	FT%	RPG	APG	SPG	BPG	PPG	PIR
2015–2016	Vimpelin Veto	15	–	35.3	.468	.257	.693	11.9	3.8	3.9	0.7	22.6	–
2016–2017	Vimpelin Veto	27	–	32.6	.439	.214	.620	9.6	5.4	3.1	0.3	17.8	–
2017–2018	Tapiolan Honka	33	–	31.5	.404	.274	.662	13.6	3.7	2.8	0.5	15.1	–
