= Ísak Ernir Kristinsson =

Icelandic basketball referee and politician

- Born: 22 July 1993 (age 32); Iceland
- Basketball career
- Position: Basketball referee
- Officiating career: 2009–present

Ísak Ernir Kristinsson (born 22 July 1993) is an Icelandic FIBA referee and a politician.

== Basketball ==
Ísak Ernir started refereeing in the Icelandic national leagues at the age of sixteen and soon established himself as one of the top referees in the country. In 2017 he was selected to referee in the NBA Summer League. On 24 January 2018, he ejected a fan from a game between ÍR and Njarðvík's after the fan had leaned over him from the sidelines and called him a racist.

In August 2019, Ísak Ernir was named an official FIBA referee.

On 16 October 2019, Ísak was involved in a controversy with KR player Unnur Tara Jónsdóttir, who is a practicing medical doctor outside of basketball, after she requested permission to enter the court during a stoppage to attend to a teammate who had been suffered a serious leg injury after a hard landing moments before. Ísak denied her the permission and gave her a technical foul after she indicated that she would then ask one of the other referees at the game for permission instead. After the incident caused an uproar with fans, the Icelandic Basketball Association Referee Committee issued a statement where it stated that Ísak admitted that it had been a mistake on his behalf to deny Unnur permission to attend to her injured teammate and that the Committee agreed with that assessment.

== Politics ==
In 2016, Ísak Ernir ran for Alþingi as a member of the Independence Party. In July 2018 he was appointed by Bjarni Benediktsson, the Financial Minister of Iceland and leader of the Independence Party, as chairman of Kadeco, a state owned redevelopment company that was created in 2006 to oversee the sales of buildings that belonged to the former US Naval Air Station in Keflavík. In 2019, it was revealed that Ísak was dating Bjarni's daughter.

== Personal life ==
Ísak Ernir is the son of long time basketball referee Kristinn Óskarsson. In 2020, he had his first child with Margrét Bjarnadóttir, the daughter of Bjarni Benediktsson.
