= Ariana Moorer =

American basketball player

Personal information
- Born: February 9, 1991 (age 35)
- Listed height: 170 cm (5 ft 7 in)

Career information
- High school: Hylton; Dale City, Virginia
- College: Virginia (2008–2012)
- Playing career: 2012–present
- Position: Point guard

Career history
- 2012: AZS Gorzów
- 2014–2015: D.C. Bluestreakz
- 2015–2016: Željezničar Sarajevo
- 2016–2017: Keflavík
- 2017–2018: GS Esperides Kallitheas
- 2018–2020: AO Sporting Athens
- 2019: Gold Coast Rollers
- 2020: Botaş SK
- 2020–2021: Fjölnir
- 2021: Esperides Kallitheas

Career highlights
- Icelandic champion (2017); Icelandic Cup winner (2017); Úrvalsdeild Playoffs MVP (2017); Úrvalsdeild Foreign Player of the Year (2017); Icelandic Cup Finals MVP (2017); ACC Sixth Player of the Year (2011)

Ariana Moorer (born February 9, 1991) is an American basketball player. In 2017, she won the Icelandic championship and the Icelandic Cup while being named the Úrvalsdeild Foreign Player of the Year, Úrvalsdeild Playoffs MVP and the Icelandic Cup Finals MVP.

== Playing career ==
After graduating from the University of Virginia, Moorer started her professional career with AZS Gorzów.

In November 2016, Moorer signed with Úrvalsdeild kvenna club Keflavík, replacing fellow American Dominique Hudson. She had a successful season, winning the Icelandic championship and the Icelandic Cup while being named the Úrvalsdeild Foreign Player of the Year, Úrvalsdeild Playoffs MVP and the Icelandic Cup Finals MVP.

In 2019, Moorer played for the Gold Coast Rollers. For the season she averaged 18.1 points, 8.9 rebounds and 5.4 assists, helping the Rollers to the QBL finals.

In January 2020, Moorer signed with Botaş SK. She left the team in March 2020 due to the coronavirus pandemic in Turkey.

In September 2020, Moorer returned to Iceland and signed with Fjölnir, replacing injured Ariel Hearn. She left the team in January 2021 following Hearn's return from injury.

=== Virginia statistics ===
Legend
GP	Games played	GS	Games started	MPG	Minutes per game
FG%	Field goal percentage	3P%	3-point field goal percentage	FT%	Free throw percentage
RPG	Rebounds per game	APG	Assists per game	SPG	Steals per game
BPG	Blocks per game	PPG	Points per game	**Bold**	Career high

Year	Team	GP	Points	FG%	3P%	FT%	RPG	APG	SPG	BPG	PPG
2008–09	Virginia	34	248	33.8%	26.7%	71.7%	3.5	2.3	1.2	0.1	7.3
2009–10	Virginia	30	211	25.1%	19.7%	72.3%	4.1	2.7	1.4	0.2	7.0
2010–11	Virginia	33	320	34.1%	18.0%	73.5%	4.2	3.1	1.3	**0.2**	9.7
2011–12	Virginia	**36**	**518**	**36.7%**	**27.0%**	**77.8%**	**5.4**	**3.6**	**2.8**	0.2	**14.4**
Career		133	1297	33.2%	11.1%	74.7%	13.0	2.9	1.7	0.2	9.8
