= ÍR (women's basketball) =

Íþróttafélag Reykjavíkur
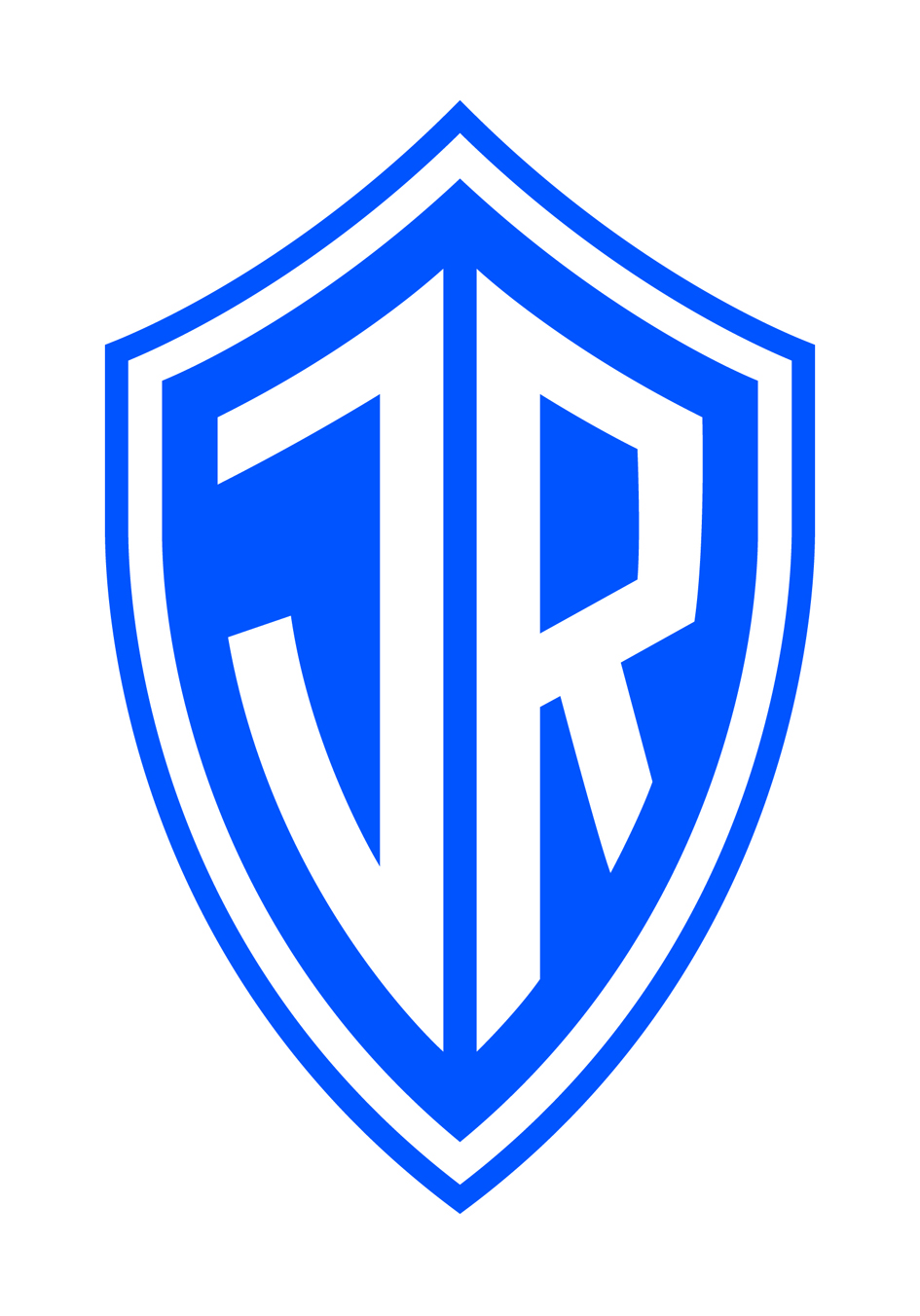
- Founded: 1950
- History: ÍR; 1950–2000; ÍR/Breiðablik; 2000–2002; ÍR; 2002–present
- Arena: Hertz-Hellirinn
- Location: Reykjavík, Iceland
- Team colors: Blue, White
- Championships: 11 Icelandic championships 1 Icelandic Cup
| Home | Away |

The Íþróttafélag Reykjavíkur women's basketball team, commonly known as ÍR, is the women's basketball department of Íþróttafélag Reykjavíkur. It is based in Reykjavík, Iceland.

== History ==
ÍR women's team was founded in 1950 and was one of the pioneers of women's basketball in Iceland as one of the founding members of the women's Icelandic women's championship tournament. It is also one of the most successful women's team in the country, winning a total of 11 national championships.

After not fielding a team since being relegated from the Úrvalsdeild in 2004, the team was revived in 2017 and registered into Division I for the 2017-2018 season. On June 16, 2017, the club hired former player Ólafur Jónas Sigurðsson as the head coach of the team.

In June 2021, the team hired Kristjana Eir Jónsdóttir, the former assistant coach of ÍR men's team, as its head coach. She replaced Ísak Máni Wíum who led the team to a second place finish during the 2020–21 season.

== Arena ==
ÍR plays its home games at the Hertz-Hellirinn.

== Notable players ==
Criteria

To appear in this section a player must have either:

- Played at least three seasons for the club.
- Set a club record or won an individual award while at the club.
- Played at least one official international match for their national team at any time.
- Played at least one official WNBA match at any time.

- (Iceland) Anna Dís Sveinbjörnsdóttir
- (Iceland) Ásta Garðarsdóttir
- (Iceland) Auður Íris Ólafsdóttir
- (Iceland) Birna Eiríksdóttir
- (Iceland) Gréta María Grétarsdóttir
- (Iceland) Guðrún A. Sigurðardóttir
- (Iceland) Guðrún Gunnarsdóttir
- (Iceland) Guðrún Ólafsdóttir
- (Iceland) Hildigunnur Hilmarsdóttir
- (Iceland) Hildur Sigurðardóttir
- (Iceland) Hrönn Harðardóttir´
- (Iceland) Kristrún Sigurjónsdóttir
- (Iceland) Linda Stefánsdóttir
- (Iceland) Lína Gunnarsdóttir
- (Iceland) Olga Bjarnadóttir
- (Iceland) Vala Úlfljótsdóttir
- (Iceland) Þóra Gunnarsdóttir
- (Iceland) Þóra Ragnarsdóttir
- (Iceland) Þórunn Bjarnadóttir

== Coaches ==
- (Iceland) Hrefna Ingimarsdóttir: 1950–1959
- (Iceland) Einar Ólafsson: 1959–1964, ?–1975, 1980–1981
- (United States) Robert Stanley: 1981–1982
- (United States) Jim Dooley: 1982–1983
- (Iceland) Kristinn Jörundsson: 1983–1984
- (Iceland) Hreinn Þorkelsson: 1984–1985
- (Iceland) Benedikt Ingþórsson: 1985–1986
- (Iceland) Kristján Oddsson: 1986–1987
- (Iceland) Jón Jörundsson: 1987–1989, 1994, 1995
- (United States) Thomas Lee: 1989–1990
- (Iceland) Kristján Sigurður F. Jónsson: 1990–1992
- (Iceland) Helgi Jóhannsson: 1992–1993
- (Iceland) Einar Ólafsson: 1993–1994
- (Iceland) Bragi Reynisson: 1994
- (Iceland) Jón Örn Guðmundsson: 1994–1995
- (Iceland) Eggert Garðarsson: 1995–1996
- (Canada) Antonio Vallejo: 1996–1997
- (Iceland) Karl Jónsson: 1997–1999
- (Iceland) Hlynur Skúli Auðunsson: 2003–2004
- (Iceland) Ólafur J. Sigurðsson: 2017–2020
- (Iceland) Ísak Máni Wíum: 2020–2021
- (Iceland) Kristjana Eir Jónsdóttir: 2021–2022
- (Iceland) Ari Gunnarsson 2022
- (Iceland) Sigurbjörg Rós Sigurðardóttir 2022–2023
- (Iceland) Andri Þór Kristinsson 2023–

== Trophies and awards ==
=== Trophies ===
- Úrvalsdeild kvenna: (11)

1956, 1957, 1958, 1963, 1966, 1967, 1970, 1972, 1973, 1974, 1975

- Icelandic Basketball Cup: (1)
  - 1979
- Division I: (1)
  - 2003

=== Awards ===
Úrvalsdeild Women's Domestic Player of the Year

- Linda Stefánsdóttir – 1991, 1993

Úrvalsdeild Women's Domestic All-First Team

- Linda Stefánsdóttir – 1990, 1991, 1992, 1993, 1996
- Anna Dís Sveinbjörnsdóttir – 1996

Úrvalsdeild Women's Young Player of the Year

- Gréta María Grétarsdóttir – 1994
- Þórunn Bjarnadóttir – 1997
- Guðrún A. Sigurðardóttir – 1998
- Hildur Sigurðardóttir – 1999

Úrvalsdeild kvenna Coach of the Year

- Antonio Vallejo – 1997
- Karl Jónsson – 1998
