= 2006–07 Úrvalsdeild kvenna (basketball) =

Iceland Express deild kvenna^{1}
- Duration: October 21, 2006 – April 14, 2007
- Teams: 6

Regular season
- Top seed: Haukar
- Relegated: Breiðablik

Finals
- Champions: Haukar (1st title)
- Runners-up: Keflavík
- Semi-finalists: ÍS, Grindavík
- Finals MVP: (Iceland) Helena Sverrisdóttir

Awards
- Domestic MVP: (Iceland) Helena Sverrisdóttir
- Foreign MVP: (United States) Tamara Bowie

Statistical leaders
Points	(United States) Tamara Bowie	30.5
Rebounds	(United States) Tamara Bowie	14.8
Assists	(Iceland) Helena Sverrisdóttir	9.8

Records
- Winning streak: Haukar; 11 games
- ^{1} Sponsored league name, referring to Úrvalsdeild kvenna.

The 2006–07 Úrvalsdeild kvenna was the 49th season of the Úrvalsdeild kvenna, the top-tier women's basketball league in Iceland. The season started on October 21, 2006 and ended on April 14, 2007. Haukar won its first title by defeating Keflavík 3–1 in the Finals.

== Competition format ==
The participating teams first played a conventional round-robin schedule with every team playing each opponent twice "home" and twice "away" for a total of 20 games. The top four teams qualified for the championship playoffs whilst the bottom team was relegated to Division I.

== Regular season ==
Pos	Team	Pld	W	L	PF	PA	PD	Pts	Qualification or relegation
1	Haukar	20	19	1	1900	1277	+623	38	Qualification to playoffs
2	Keflavík	20	14	6	1871	1427	+444	28	Qualification to playoffs
3	Grindavík	20	14	6	1631	1466	+165	28	Qualification to playoffs
4	ÍS	20	7	13	1310	1478	−168	14	Qualification to playoffs
5	Hamar	20	3	17	1215	1709	−494	6	
6	Breiðablik	20	3	17	1241	1811	−570	6	Relegated

Source: 2006–2007

== Playoffs ==
Semifinals
1	Haukar	3
4	ÍS	2
2	Keflavík	3
3	Grindavík	1

Finals
1	Haukar	3
2	Keflavík	1

Source: 2007 Iceland Express deildin playoffs
