= Grindavík (women's basketball) =

Ungmennafélag Grindavíkur
- Leagues: Úrvalsdeild kvenna
- Arena: Röstin
- Location: Grindavík, Iceland
- Team colors: Yellow, blue, white
- President: Ingibergur Þór Jónasson
- Head coach: Þorleifur Ólafsson
- Championships: 1 Úrvalsdeild kvenna 2 Icelandic Basketball Cup
- Website: UMFG.is
Home	Away

The Grindavík women's basketball team, commonly known as Grindavík or UMFG for short, is the women's basketball department of Ungmennafélag Grindavíkur multi-sport club, based in the town of Grindavík in Iceland. It won the national championship in 1997 and the Icelandic Basketball Cup in 2008 and 2015.

== Recent history ==
In April 2019, Grindavík defeated 1. deild kvenna champions Fjölnir, 3-0, in the promotion playoffs for a seat in the Úrvalsdeild. With the worst record in the league, the team was relegated from the Úrvalsdeild in March 2020 after the final games of the season and the playoffs were canceled due to the Coronavirus pandemic in Iceland. In 2021, Grindavík defeated 1. deild kvenna champions Njarðvík, 3-2, in the promotion playoffs finals. After losing the first two games, the team mounted a improbable comeback by winning the next three games.

== Honors ==
Úrvalsdeild

- Winners (1): 1997

Icelandic Basketball Cup

- Winners (2): 2008, 2015

Icelandic Super Cup

- Winners (1): 1997

1. deild kvenna

- Winners (1): 2012

Icelandic Company Cup

- Winners (1): 2001

== Notable players ==
Criteria

To appear in this section a player must have either:

- Set a club record or won an individual award while at the club.
- Played at least one official international match for their national team at any time.
- Played at least one official WNBA match at any time.

- (Iceland) Birna Valgarðsdóttir
- (Iceland) Bríet Sif Hinriksdóttir
- (Iceland) Danielle Rodriguez
- (Iceland) Embla Kristínardóttir
- (Iceland) Erla Reynisdóttir
- (Iceland) Erla Þorsteinsdóttir
- (Iceland) Hildur Sigurðardóttir
- (Iceland) Ingibjörg Jakobsdóttir
- (Iceland) Íris Sverrisdóttir
- (Iceland) Jovana Stefánsdóttir
- (Iceland) Ólöf Helga Pálsdóttir
- (Iceland) María Ben Erlingsdóttir
- (Iceland) Pálína Gunnlaugsdóttir
- (Iceland) Petrúnella Skúladóttir
- (Iceland) Sigrún Sjöfn Ámundadóttir
- (Iceland) Svandís Anna Sigurðardóttir
- (Denmark) Emilie Hesseldal
- (Denmark) Ena Viso
- (Denmark) Sofie Tryggedsson Preetzmann
- (Sweden) Farhiya Abdi
- (Sweden) Ellen Nyström
- (New Zealand) Tegan Graham
- (United States) Jessica Gaspar
- (United States) Penny Peppas
- (United States) Tamara Bowie
- (United States) Tamara Stocks

== Coaches ==
- (United States) Richard Ross 1986–1987
- (United States) Brad Casey 7-11 1987–1988
- (United States) Douglas Harvey 1988–1989
- (Iceland) Guðmundur Bragason 1989–1990
- (Iceland) Ellert S. Magnússon 1990–1991
- (United States) Dan Krebbs 1991–1992
- (Iceland) Pálmi Ingólfsson 1992
- (United States) Dan Krebbs 4-5 1992–1993
- (Iceland) Pálmi Ingólfsson 1993
- (Iceland) Nökkvi Már Jónsson 1993–1994
- (Iceland) Nökkvi Már Jónsson 1994–1995
- (Iceland) Friðrik Ingi Rúnarsson 1995–1996
- (Iceland) Ellert S. Magnússon 1996–1997
- (Iceland) Jón Guðmundsson 1997–1998
- (Iceland) Pétur Rúrik Guðmundsson 1998
- (Iceland) Ellert S. Magnússon 1998–1999
- (Iceland) Alexander Ermolinskij 1999–2000
- (Iceland) Páll Axel Vilbergsson 2000
- (Iceland) Pétur Rúrik Guðmundsson2000–2001
- (Iceland) Unndór Sigurðsson 2001–2002
- (Iceland) Eyjólfur Guðlaugsson 2002–2003
- (Iceland) Pétur K. Guðmundsson 2003–2004
- (Iceland) Örvar Þór Kristjánsson 2004
- (Iceland) Henning Henningsson 2004–2005
- (Iceland) Unndór Sigurðsson 2005–2007
- (Serbia) Igor Beljanski 2007-08
- (Iceland) Pétur Rúrik Guðmundsson 2008–2009
- (Iceland) Jóhann Þór Ólafsson 2009–2011
- (Iceland) Unknown 2011–2012
- (Iceland) Bragi Magnússon 2012
- (Iceland) Ellert Magnússon 2012
- (United States) Crystal Smith 2012–2013
- (Iceland) Jón Halldór Eðvaldsson 2013–2014
- (United States) Lewis Clinch 2014
- (Iceland) Sverrir Þór Sverrisson 2014–2015
- (Iceland) Daníel Guðni Guðmundsson 2015–2016
- (Iceland) Björn Steinar Brynjólfsson 2016
- (Iceland) Bjarni Magnússon 2016–2017
- (Iceland) Páll Axel Vilbergsson 2017
- (United States) Angela Rodriguez 2017-2018
- (Iceland) Ólöf Helga Pálsdóttir 2018
- (Iceland) Jóhann Árni Ólafsson 2018–2020
- (Iceland) Ólöf Helga Pálsdóttir 2020–2021
- (Iceland) Þorleifur Ólafsson 2021–2026
- (Iceland) Pétur Már Sigurðsson 2026–present
