= Haukar (women's basketball) =

- Leagues: Úrvalsdeild kvenna
- Arena: Ásvellir
- Location: Hafnarfjörður, Iceland
- Team colors: red, blue, white
- Championships: (4) Úrvalsdeild kvenna
- Website: Haukar.is
Home	Away

The Haukar women's basketball team, commonly known as Haukar (Icelandic pronunciation: [ˈhøyːkar̥]), is the women's basketball department of Knattspyrnufélagið Haukar multi-sport club, based in the town of Hafnarfjörður, Iceland.

== Recent history ==
On 23 September 2021, Haukar became the first Icelandic women's basketball team to win in a continental competition when it defeated Clube União Sportiva, 81–76, in the first leg of the 2021–22 EuroCup Women qualifiers. In the game, Jana Falsdóttir became the youngest Icelandic female player to play and score in a continental competition, breaking the records of Unnur Tara Jónsdóttir and Ragna Margrét Brynjarsdóttir. On 30 September, Haukar lost the second leg 79–81, after starting the game 2–21, but advanced to the regular season with a combined 160–157 victory.

In January 2023, Haukar won their third straight Icelandic Cup, after defeating Keflavík in the Cup final.

On 20 September 2023, Haukar defeated Valur, 78–77, in the Icelandic Super Cup with Keira Robinson scoring the game winning basket at the buzzer.

== Home court ==
Haukar play their home games in Ólafssalur (English: Ólaf's hall) in Ásvellir. The court is named after Ólafur Rafnsson, a former Haukar player and president of FIBA Europe.

== Trophies and awards ==
=== Trophies ===
- Úrvalsdeild kvenna (5):

2006, 2007, 2009, 2018, 2025

- Icelandic Basketball Cup (9):

1984, 1992, 2005, 2007, 2010, 2014, 2021, 2022, 2023

- Icelandic Supercup (2):

2006, 2021

- Icelandic Company Cup (4):

2005, 2006, 2011, 2015

- Division I (1):

2002, 2004

=== Awards ===
Úrvalsdeild Women's Domestic Player of the Year

- Eva Margrét Kristjánsdóttir - 2023
- Hanna Björg Kjartansdóttir – 1992
- Helena Sverrisdóttir – 2005, 2006, 2007, 2016, 2018
- Íris Sverrisdóttir – 2012
- Ragna Margrét Brynjarsdóttir – 2011
- Sóley Indriðadóttir – 1984

Úrvalsdeild Women's Foreign Player of the Year

- Megan Mahoney – 2006
- Slavica Dimovska – 2009
- Heather Ezell – 2010
- Lele Hardy – 2014

Úrvalsdeild Women's Domestic All-First Team

- Eva Margrét Kristjánsdóttir - 2022, 2023
- Hanna Björg Kjartansdóttir – 1992
- Helena Sverrisdóttir – 2005, 2006, 2007, 2016, 2018, 2022
- Herdís Erna Gunnarsdóttir – 1988, 1990
- Kristrún Sigurjónsdóttir – 2008, 2009
- Sara Rún Hinriksdóttir – 2021
- Sólveig Pálsdóttir – 1988
- Tinna Guðrún Alexandersdóttir – 2023
- Þóra Kristín Jónsdóttir – 2018, 2021

Úrvalsdeild Women's Playoffs MVP

- Megan Mahoney – 2006
- Helena Sverrisdóttir – 2007, 2018
- Slavica Dimovska – 2009

Úrvalsdeild Women's Defensive Player of the Year

- Dýrfinna Arnardóttir – 2018
- Pálína Gunnlaugsdóttir – 2005, 2006, 2007

Úrvalsdeild Women's Young Player of the Year

- Helena Sverrisdóttir – 2003
- Ragna Margrét Brynjarsdóttir – 2007, 2008
- Margrét Rósa Hálfdánardóttir – 2012
- Elísabeth Ýr Ægisdóttir – 2021
- Tinna Guðrún Alexandersdóttir – 2022, 2023

Úrvalsdeild kvenna Coach of the Year

- Ágúst Björgvinsson – 2005, 2006, 2007
- Bjarni Magnússon – 2022
- Ingvar Guðjónsson – 2018

Icelandic Cup Finals MVP

- Helena Sverrisdóttir – 2021, 2022
- Lele Hardy – 2014
- María Lind Sigurðardóttir – 2010
- Sólrún Inga Gísladóttir – 2023

== Notable players ==
Criteria

To appear in this section a player must have either:

- Set a club record or won an individual award while at the club.
- Played at least one official international match for their national team at any time.
- Played at least one official WNBA match at any time.

- (Iceland) Auður Íris Ólafsdóttir
- (Iceland) Bríet Sif Hinriksdóttir
- (Iceland) Dýrfinna Arnarsdóttir
- (Iceland) Eva Margrét Kristjánsdóttir
- (Iceland) Guðbjörg Norðfjörð
- (Iceland) Guðbjörg Sverrisdóttir
- (Iceland) Guðrún Ósk Ámundadóttir
- (Iceland) Gunnhildur Gunnarsdóttir
- (Iceland) Hanna Hálfdánardóttir
- (Iceland) Hanna Björg Kjartansdóttir
- (Iceland) Hafdís Hafberg
- (Iceland) Helena Sverrisdóttir
- (Iceland) Herdís Erna Gunnarsdóttir
- (Iceland) Jana Falsdóttir
- (United States) Jence Ann Rhoads
- (Iceland) Jóhanna Björk Sveinsdóttir
- (Iceland) Kristrún Sigurjónsdóttir
- (United States) Lele Hardy
- (Iceland) Lovísa Henningsdóttir
- (Iceland) Margrét Rósa Hálfdánardóttir
- (Iceland) María Lind Sigurðardóttir
- (United States) Megan Mahoney
- (Iceland) Pálína Gunnlaugsdóttir
- (Iceland) Ragna Margrét Brynjarsdóttir
- (Iceland) Rósa Björk Pétursdóttir
- (Iceland) Sara Rún Hinriksdóttir
- (Iceland) Sigrún Björg Ólafsdóttir
- (Iceland) Sigrún S. Skarphéðinsdóttir
- (Iceland) Sólveig Pálsdóttir
- (Iceland) Sylvía Rún Hálfdánardóttir
- (Iceland) Telma Björk Fjalarsdóttir
- (Iceland) Unnur Tara Jónsdóttir
- (Iceland) Þóra Kristín Jónsdóttir

== Coaches ==
- (Iceland) Kolbrún Jónsdóttir 1982–1985
- (Iceland) Ingimar Jónsson 1985–1986
- (Iceland) Pálmar Sigurðsson 1986–1987
- (Iceland) Ívar Ásgrímsson 1987–1988
- (Iceland) Pálmar Sigurðsson 1988–1989
- (Iceland) Ívar Ásgrímsson 1989–1991
- (Iceland) Ingvar Jónsson 1991–1992
- (Iceland) Eggert Maríuson 2011–2012
- (Iceland) Predrag Bojovic 2002–2003
- (Iceland) Ágúst S. Björgvinsson 2004–2007
- (Iceland) Yngvi Gunnlaugsson 2007–2009
- (Iceland) Henning Henningsson 2009–2011
- (Iceland) Bjarni Magnússon 2011–2014
- (Iceland) Ívar Ásgrímsson 2014–2015
- (Iceland) Ingvar Þór Guðjónsson, (Iceland) Andri Þór Kristinsson, (Iceland) Helena Sverrisdóttir 2015–2016
- (Iceland) Ingvar Þór Guðjónsson 2016–2018
- (Iceland) Ólöf Helga Pálsdóttir 2018–2020
- (Iceland) Bjarni Magnússon 2020 (interim)
- (Iceland) Ari Gunnarsson 2020
- (Iceland) Bjarni Magnússon 2024–present
- (Iceland) Ingvar Þór Guðjónsson 2024
- (Iceland) Emil Barja 2024–2026
