= Hamar (women's basketball) =

Icelandic women's basketball team

- Leagues: 1. deild kvenna
- Founded: Hamar; 2000–2004; Hamar/Selfoss; 2004–2006; Hamar; 2006–2020; Hamar/Þór; 2020–present
- Arena: Frystikistan
- Location: Hveragerði, Iceland
- Team colors: Blue, White
- Head coach: Hallgrímur Brynjólfsson
- Website: Hamarsport.is
| Home | Away |

The Hamar women's basketball team, commonly known as Hamar, is the women's basketball department of Íþróttafélagið Hamar, based in the town of Hveragerði, Iceland.

== History ==
The team was the runner-up to the 2010 national championship. The following season it posted the best record in the league. In May 2020, the club announced that they would field a joint women's team with Þór Þorlákshöfn in the 1. deild kvenna during the upcoming season.

== Trophies and awards ==
=== Trophies ===
- 1. deild kvenna (3):
  - 2006, 2013, 2024*

*As Hamar/Þór

=== Awards ===
Úrvalsdeild Women's Domestic All-First Team

- Kristrún Sigurjónsdóttir – 2010

Úrvalsdeild Women's Young Player of the Year

- Marín Laufey Davíðsdóttir – 2014
- Guðbjörg Sverrisdóttir – 2010

== Notable players ==
Criteria

To appear in this section a player must have either:

- Played at least three seasons for the club.
- Set a club record or won an individual award while at the club.
- Played at least one official international match for their national team at any time.
- Played at least one official WNBA match at any time.

- (United States) Abby Beeman
- (Iceland) Elín Sóley Hrafnkelsdóttir
- (Iceland) Fanney Lind Thomas
- (Iceland) Guðbjörg Sverrisdóttir
- (Iceland) Íris Ásgeirsdóttir
- (Iceland) Jóhanna Björk Sveinsdóttir
- (Poland) Julia Demirer
- (Iceland) Kristrún Rut Antonsdóttir
- (Iceland) Kristrún Sigurjónsdóttir
- (Iceland) Marín Laufey Davíðsdóttir
- (Iceland) Salbjörg Ragna Sævarsdóttir
- (North Macedonia) Slavica Dimovska
- (Iceland) Sigrún Sjöfn Ámundadóttir

== Coaches ==
- (Iceland) Andri Þór Kristinsson 2006–2007
- (Iceland) Ari Gunnarsson 2007–2009
- (Iceland) Ágúst Björgvinsson 2009–2011
- (Iceland) Lárus Jónsson 2011–2012
- (Iceland) Hallgrímur Brynjólfsson 2012–2015
- (Iceland) Oddur Benediktsson 2015–2016
- (Iceland) Kristinn Ólafsson 2017–2018
- (Iceland) Daði Steinn Arnarsson 2019–2020
- (Iceland) Hallgrímur Brynjólfsson 2020–present
