= Njarðvík (women's basketball) =

Ungmennafélagið Njarðvík
- Leagues: 1. deild kvenna
- Arena: Ljónagryfjan (The Lion's Den)
- Location: Reykjanesbær, Iceland
- Team colors: green, white
- President: Hafsteinn Sveinssonr
- Championships: 3 Icelandic championships
- Website: UMFN.is
Home	Away

Njarðvík women's basketball, commonly known as Njarðvík, is the women's basketball department of Ungmennafélag Njarðvíkur, based in the town of Reykjanesbær in Iceland. It won the national championship and the basketball cup in 2012.

== Arena ==
Njarðvík plays its home games at Íþróttahús Njarðvíkur, commonly nicknamed Ljónagryfjan (English: The Lion's Den).

== Trophies and awards ==
=== Trophies ===
Úrvalsdeild

- Winners: 2012, 2022, 2026

Icelandic Basketball Cup

- Winners: 2012, 2025

Icelandic Basketball Supercup: :

- Winners: 2002, 2022, 2025

Division I

- Winners (5): 2000, 2001, 2009, 2015, 2021

=== Awards ===
Úrvalsdeild Women's Domestic Player of the Year

- Danielle Rodriguez – 2026

Úrvalsdeild Women's Foreign Player of the Year

- Lele Hardy – 2012, 2013

Úrvalsdeild Women's Domestic All-First Team

- Harpa Magnúsdóttir – 1989
- Petrúnella Skúladóttir – 2012

Úrvalsdeild kvenna Playoffs MVP

- Lele Hardy – 2012
- Aliyah Collier – 2022
- Danielle Rodriguez – 2026

Cup Finals MVP

- Shanae Baker-Brice – 2012

Úrvalsdeild kvenna Coach of the Year

- Suzette Sargeant – 1996
- Einar Árni Jóhannsson – 2003
- Sverrir Þór Sverrisson – 2012

1. deild kvenna Foreign Player of the Year

- Chelsea Nacole Jennings – 2021

1. deild kvenna Domestic All-First team

- Kamilla Sól Viktorsdóttir – 2019
- Vilborg Jónsdóttir – 2021

1. deild kvenna Young Player of the Year

- Vilborg Jónsdóttir – 2019

1. deild kvenna Coach of the Year

- Rúnar Ingi Erlingsson – 2021

== Notable players ==
Criteria

To appear in this section a player must have either:

- Set a club record or won an individual award while at the club.
- Played at least one official international match for their national team at any time.

- (United States) Aliyah Collier
- (United States) Brittanny Dinkins
- (Iceland) Bríet Sif Hinriksdóttir
- (United States) Carmen Tyson-Thomas
- (Iceland) Danielle Rodriguez
- (Denmark) Ena Viso
- (Denmark) Emilie Hesseldal
- (Iceland) Helga Jónasdóttir
- (Portugal) Lavínia Da Silva
- (United States) Lele Hardy
- (Iceland) Ingibjörg Elva Vilbergsdóttir
- (Iceland) Isabella Ósk Sigurðardóttir
- (Iceland) Jana Falsdóttir
- (Iceland) María Jóhannesdóttir
- (Iceland) Ólöf Helga Pálsdóttir
- (Sweden) Paulina Hersler
- (Iceland) Petrúnella Skúladóttir
- (Portugal) Raquel Laneiro
- (Iceland) Rannveig Randversdóttir
- (Iceland) Salbjörg Ragna Sævarsdóttir
- (United States) Shanae Baker-Brice
- (Iceland) Sigríður Guðbjörnsdóttir
- (Iceland) Þórunn Magnúsdóttir

== Coaches ==
- (United States) Danny Shouse 1981–1982
- (United States) Alex Gilbert 1982
- (United States) Bill Kotterman 1982–1983
- (Iceland) Jón Kr. Gíslason 1983–1984
- (Iceland) Jónas Jóhannesson 1984–1985
- (Iceland) Valur Ingimundarson 1985–1986
- (Iceland) Hreiðar Hreiðarsson 1986–1987
- (Iceland) Helgi Rafnsson 1987–1988
- (Iceland) Friðrik Ingi Rúnarsson 1988–1990
- (Iceland) Valur Ingimundarson 1994–1995
- (United States) Suzette Sargeant 1995–1996
- (Iceland) Jón Guðbrandsson 1996–1997
- (Iceland) Einar Árni Jóhannsson 1997
- (Iceland) Júlíus Valgeirsson 1998–1999
- (Iceland) Ísak Tómasson 2001
- (Iceland) Einar Árni Jóhannsson 2002–2003
- (United States) Andrea Gaines 2003–2004
- (Iceland) Jón Júlíus Árnason 2004
- (Iceland) Jón Júlíus Árnason 2004–2005
- (Iceland) Agnar Már Gunnarsson 2005
- (Iceland) Unndór Sigurðsson 2009–2010
- (Iceland) Sverrir Þór Sverrisson 2010–2012
- (United States) Lele Hardy 2012–2013
- (United States) Nigel Moore 2013
- (Iceland) Agnar Már Gunnarsson 2013–2014
- (Iceland) Friðrik Ingi Rúnarsson 2014–2016
- (Iceland) Agnar Már Gunnarsson 2016–2017
- (Iceland) Hallgrímur Brynjólfsson 2017–2018
- (Iceland) Ragnar Halldór Ragnarsson 2018–2020
- (Iceland) Rúnar Ingi Erlingsson 2020–2024
- (Iceland) Einar Árni Jóhannsson 2024–present
