= Icelandic Women's Basketball Company Cup =

Defunct basketball competition of Iceland

- Sport: Basketball
- Founded: 2000
- Folded: 2015
- Country: Iceland
- Continent: (European Union) Europe
- Most titles: Keflavík (7 titles)
- Related competitions: Úrvalsdeild kvenna Icelandic Cup; Icelandic Supercup
- Website: KKI.is

The Icelandic Women's Basketball Company Cup, commonly known as the Women's Company Cup (Icelandic: Fyrirtækjabikar kvenna), was an annual basketball competition between clubs in Iceland that was organized by the Icelandic Basketball Federation. It was Iceland's second-tier cup competition, and is not to be confused with Iceland's first-tier cup competition, the Icelandic Cup.

== History and format ==
The Company Cup was founded in 2000 and its first edition, bearing the name Kjörísbikarinn after its sponsor Kjörís, took place in December that year. It included all five Úrvalsdeild kvennaa teams and three teams from the second-tier 1. deild kvenna, with Keflavík, KFÍ, KR and ÍS advancing to the final four. Keflavík and KR went on to the Cup final where KR won 48-34.

Its last edition to date was held in 2015 where Haukar defeated Keflavík in the Cup finals, 47-70.

== Title holders ==
- 2000 KR
- 2001 Grindavík
- 2002 Keflavík
- 2003 Keflavík
- 2004 Keflavík
- 2005 Haukar
- 2006 Haukar
- 2007 Keflavík
- 2008 Keflavík
- 2009 KR
- 2010 Keflavík
- 2011 Haukar
- 2012 Snæfell
- 2013 Valur
- 2014 Keflavík
- 2015 Haukar

== See also ==
- Icelandic Basketball Federation
- Úrvalsdeild kvenna
- Icelandic Basketball Cup
- Icelandic Basketball Supercup
- Icelandic Division I
