= Icelandic Women's Basketball Supercup =

Icelandic Basketball Supercup
- Sport: Basketball
- Founded: 1995
- No. of teams: 2
- Country: Iceland
- Confederation: FIBA Europe
- Most recent champions: Njarðvík (4th title)
- Most titles: Keflavík (11 titles)
- Broadcaster: Stöð 2 Sport
- Related competitions: Úrvalsdeild kvenna Icelandic Basketball Cup
- Website: KKI.is

The Icelandic Women's Basketball Supercup (Icelandic: Meistarakeppni kvenna) is a basketball super cup competition that opposes the latest winners of the Úrvalsdeild kvenna – the top-tier Icelandic national women's domestic league – and the winners of the Icelandic Women's Basketball Cup, the top-tier national women's cup competition in Iceland. Created in 1995, it is organised by the Icelandic Basketball Federation – who run the Úrvalsdeild and the Icelandic Cup, and it traditionally opens the season.

== Title holders ==
Keflavík are the record-holders with 11 cups.

- 1995 Breiðablik
- 1996 Keflavík
- 1997 Grindavík
- 1998 ÍS
- 1999 KR
- 2000 Keflavík
- 2001 Keflavík
- 2002 Njarðvík
- 2003 Keflavík
- 2004 Keflavík
- 2005 Keflavík
- 2006 Haukar
- 2007 Keflavík
- 2008 Keflavík
- 2009 KR
- 2010 KR
- 2011 KR
- 2012 Snæfell
- 2013 Keflavík
- 2014 Snæfell
- 2015 Snæfell
- 2016 Snæfell
- 2017 Keflavík
- 2018 Keflavík
- 2019 Valur
- 2020 Skallagrímur
- 2021 Haukar
- 2022 Njarðvík
- 2023 Haukar
- 2024 Þór Akureyri
- 2025 Njarðvík
- 2026 Njarðvík

== Recent finals ==
Year	Winner	Score	Runners-up	Venue	Location	Top scorer
2008	Keflavík	73–68	Grindavík	Blue-Höllin	Keflavík	(Iceland) Pálína Gunnlaugsdóttir
2009	KR	78–45	Haukar	DHL-Höllin	Reykjavík	(United States) Heather Ezell
2010	KR	72–58	Haukar	Íþróttahúsið Stykkishólmi	Stykkishólmur	(Iceland) Margrét Kara Sturludóttir
2011	KR	88–49	Keflavík	DHL-Höllin	Reykjavík	(United States) Reyana Colson
2012	Snæfell	84–60	Njarðvík	Ljónagryfjan	Njarðvík	(United States) Kieraah Marlow
2013	Keflavík	77–74	Valur	Blue-Höllin	Keflavík	(Iceland) Kristrún Sigurjónsdóttir
2014	Snæfell	72–69	Haukar	DHL-Höllin	Reykjavík	(United States) Lele Hardy
2015	Snæfell	79–45	Grindavík	Íþróttahúsið Stykkishólmi	Stykkishólmur	(United States) Haiden Denise Palmer
2016	Snæfell	70–60	Grindavík	DHL-Höllin	Reykjavík	(United States) Taylor Brown
2017	Keflavík	93–73	Skallagrímur	Blue-Höllin	Keflavík	(United States) Carmen Tyson-Thomas
2018	Keflavík	83–77	Haukar	DHL-Höllin	Reykjavík	(United States) Brittanny Dinkins
2019	Valur	105–81	Keflavík	Hlíðarendi	Reykjavík	(Venezuela) Daniela Wallen
2020	Skallagrímur	74–68	Valur	Fjósið	Borgarnes	(Iceland) Hildur Björg Kjartansdóttir
2021	Haukar	62–58	Valur	Hlíðarendi	Reykjavík	(United States) Ameryst Alston
2022	Njarðvík	94–87	Haukar	Ljónagryfjan	Njarðvík	(United States) Aliyah Collier
2023	Haukar	78–77	Valur	Hlíðarendi	Reykjavík	(United States) Keira Robinson & (Iceland) Hildur Björg Kjartansdóttir
2024	Þór Akureyri	86–82	Keflavík	Blue-Höllin	Keflavík	(France) Amandine Justine To
2025	Njarðvík	86–83	Haukar	Ásvellir	Hafnarfjörður	(France) Amandine Justine To
2026	Njarðvík	83–78	Keflavík	Ice-Mar höllin	Njarðvík	(Iceland) Thelma Dís Ágústsdóttir

== See also ==
- Icelandic Basketball League (Úrvalsdeild)
- Icelandic Basketball Cup
- Icelandic Basketball Federation
