= Icelandic Women's Basketball Cup =

Icelandic basketball competition

- Current season, competition or edition: 2022–23 Icelandic Women's Basketball Cup
- Sport: Basketball
- Founded: 1975 season
- Country: Iceland
- Continent: (European Union) Europe
- Most recent champions: Njarðvík (2nd title)
- Most titles: Keflavík (16 titles)
- Broadcaster: RÚV
- Sponsor: VÍS
- Related competitions: Úrvalsdeild kvenna Icelandic Supercup
- Website: KKI.is

The Icelandic Women's Basketball Cup (Icelandic: Bikarkeppni KKÍ) is an annual basketball competition between clubs in Iceland. It is Iceland's first-tier cup competition, and is not to be confused with Iceland's former second-tier cup competition, the Company Cup.

== History and format ==
The first edition of the Icelandic Women's Cup championship was held in 1975 and won by Þór Akureyri. All the rounds are played with a single game knockout format. The final four and the finals are played over a single weekend.

Finally, the winner of the Icelandic Cup championship, or the runner-up if the same team wins both the cup and national championship, will then face the winner of the Úrvalsdeild kvenna championship in a single game to determine the winner of the Icelandic Supercup championship in the beginning of the next season.

=== Sponsorship ===
The Cup was known as Geysir bikarinn for sponsorship reasons from 2018 to 2020.

In January 2021, VÍS was announced as the new sponsor for the cup competition.

== Title holders ==
- 1974–75 Þór Akureyri
- 1975–76 KR
- 1976–77 KR
- 1977–78 ÍS
- 1978–79 ÍR
- 1979–80 ÍS
- 1980–81 ÍS
- 1981–82 KR
- 1982–83 KR
- 1983–84 Haukar
- 1984–85 ÍS
- 1985–86 KR
- 1986–87 KR
- 1987–88 Keflavík
- 1988–89 Keflavík
- 1989–90 Keflavík
- 1990–91 ÍS
- 1991–92 Haukar
- 1992–93 Keflavík
- 1993–94 Keflavík
- 1994–95 Keflavík
- 1995–96 Keflavík
- 1996–97 Keflavík
- 1997–98 Keflavík
- 1998–99 KR
- 1999–00 Keflavík
- 2000–01 KR
- 2001–02 KR
- 2002–03 ÍS
- 2003–04 Keflavík
- 2004–05 Haukar
- 2005–06 ÍS
- 2006–07 Haukar
- 2007–08 Grindavík
- 2008–09 KR
- 2009–10 Haukar
- 2010–11 Keflavík
- 2011–12 Njarðvík
- 2012–13 Keflavík
- 2013–14 Haukar
- 2014–15 Grindavík
- 2015–16 Snæfell
- 2016–17 Keflavík
- 2017–18 Keflavík
- 2018–19 Valur
- 2019–20 Skallagrímur
- 2020–21 Haukar
- 2021–22 Haukar
- 2022–23 Haukar
- 2023–24 Keflavík
- 2024–25 Njarðvík
- 2025–26 Keflavík

== Cup Finals MVP ==
| Year | Player | Position | Nationality | Team |
|---|---|---|---|---|
| 2010 | María Lind Sigurðardóttir | Forward | ISL | Haukar |
| 2011 | Birna Valgarðsdóttir | Forward | ISL | Keflavík |
| 2012 | Shanae Baker-Brice | Guard | USA | Njarðvík |
| 2013 | Pálína Gunnlaugsdóttir | Guard | ISL | Keflavík |
| 2014 | Lele Hardy | Center | USA | Haukar |
| 2015 | Petrúnella Skúladóttir | Forward | ISL | Grindavík |
| 2016 | Haiden Palmer | Point guard | USA | Snæfell |
| 2017 | Ariana Moorer | Point guard | USA | Keflavík |
| 2018 | Brittanny Dinkins | Point guard | USA | Keflavík |
| 2019 | Helena Sverrisdóttir | Small forward | ISL | Valur |
| 2020 | Keira Robinson | Point guard | USA | Skallagrímur |
| 2021 | Helena Sverrisdóttir | Forward | ISL | Haukar |
| 2022 | Helena Sverrisdóttir | Forward | ISL | Haukar |
| 2023 | Sólrún Inga Gísladóttir | Forward | ISL | Haukar |
| 2025 | Brittanny Dinkins | Point guard | USA | Njarðvík |
| 2026 | Keishana Washington | Point guard | USA | Keflavík |

== See also ==
- Icelandic Basketball Federation
- Úrvalsdeild kvenna
- Icelandic Basketball Supercup
- Icelandic Division I
