= 2021–22 Basketligaen =

Basketligaen
- League: Basketligaen
- Season: 2021–22
- Dates: 22 September 2021 – 19 May 2022
- Teams: 10

Finals
- Champions: Bakken Bears
- Runners-up: Svendborg Rabbits
- Third place: Horsens IC
- Finals MVP: Marvelle Harris (Bears)

Seasons
- ← 2020–21 2022–23 →

The 2021–22 Basketligaen is the 47th season of the highest professional basketball tier in Denmark. The season started on 22 September 2021 and ended 19 May 2022.

== Teams ==
Location of teams in 2021–22 Basketligaen

Team	City	Arena
BK Amager	Copenhagen	Amagerhallen
Bakken Bears	Aarhus	Vejlby-Risskov Hallen
Bears Academy	Aarhus	Vejlby-Risskov Hallen
BMS Herlev	Copenhagen (Herlev)	UCC Hallen
Copenhagen	Copenhagen	Nørrebrohallen
Horsens IC	Horsens	Forum Horsens
Randers Cimbria	Randers	Arena Randers
Svendborg Rabbits	Svendborg	Svendborg Idrætscenter
Team FOG Næstved	Næstved	Næstved Hallen
Værløse Blue Hawks	Værløse	Søndersøhallen

== Statistics ==
Category	Player	Team(s)	Statistic
Points per game	Zeke Moore	Copenhagen	20.1
Rebounds per game	Durell Vinson	Copenhagen	11.8
Assists per game	Sebastian Aris	Svendborg Rabbits	6.1
Steals per game	Andrew Ramirez	Copenhagen	2.3
Blocks per game	Reginald Kissoonlal	Randers Cimbria	2.2

Statistics after the regular season.
