= 2019–20 Basketligaen =

Basketball season in Denmark

Basketligaen
- Season: 2019–20
- Duration: 22 September 2019 – 17 March 2020
- Teams: 10

Finals
- Champions: Bakken Bears; 18th title
- Runners-up: Randers Cimbria
- Third place: Horsens IC

The 2019–20 Basketligaen is the 45th season of the highest professional basketball tier in Denmark. The season started on 22 September 2019 and was scheduled to end on 13 May 2020. On 17 March 2020, the season was ended prematurely because of the COVID-19 pandemic. Based on the standings at that time, the Bakken Bears were named Danish champions, defending their title.

== Competition format ==
Teams were divided into two groups: Pro A, joined by the best five teams in the previous season, and Pro B, the rest of the teams. Each team was scheduled to play four times against each other team in their group, and twice with teams from the other group.

The five teams of Pro A and the best three of Pro B qualified for playoffs.

== Teams ==
Location of teams in 2019–20 Basketligaen

Amager joined the league after an absence of nine years.

Team	City	Arena
Amager	Copenhagen	Amagerhallen
Bakken Bears	Aarhus	Vejlby-Risskov Hallen
BMS Herlev Wolfpack	Copenhagen	Skovlundehallen
Copenhagen	Copenhagen	Nørrebrohallen
EBAA	Aarhus	Vejlby-Risskov Hallen
Horsens IC	Horsens	Forum Horsens
Randers Cimbria	Randers	Arena Randers
Svendborg Rabbits	Svendborg	Svendborg Idrætscenter
Team FOG Næstved	Næstved	Næstved Hallen
Værløse Blue Hawks	Værløse	Søndersøhallen

== Regular season ==
=== Pro A ===
Pos	Team	Pld	W	L	PF	PA	PD	Pts	Qualification
1	Bakken Bears (C)	23	20	3	2218	1776	+442	40	Qualification to Champions League qualifying rounds
2	Randers Cimbria	24	19	5	2272	1993	+279	38	
3	Horsens	22	17	5	2017	1694	+323	34	
4	Team FOG Næstved	24	13	11	2028	1906	+122	26	
5	Svendborg Rabbits	24	11	13	1989	1965	+24	22	

Updated to match(es) played on 7 March 2020. Source: Basketligaen
(C) Champions

=== Pro B ===
Pos	Team	Pld	W	L	PF	PA	PD	Pts
1	BMS Herlev Wolfpack	21	10	11	1707	1774	−67	20
2	Værløse Blue Hawks	20	9	11	1704	1754	−50	18
3	EBAA	19	4	15	1380	1698	−318	8
4	Copenhagen	20	3	17	1546	1885	−339	6
5	Amager	19	2	17	1441	1857	−416	4

Updated to match(es) played on 7 March 2020. Source: Basketligaen

=== Results ===
Home \ Away	AMA	BAK	WOL	COP	EBA	HIC	RAN	SVE	FOG	VAE	AMA	BAK	WOL	COP	EBA	HIC	RAN	SVE	FOG	VAE
Amager	—	74–97	66–89	83–85		70–97	81–127	79–96	61–112	71–98	—		80–99							
Bakken Bears	113–91	—	96–99	104–75	121–48	80–63	89–83	83–75	95–79	102–81		—						87–83	91–72	
BMS Herlev Wolfpack	84–65	66–121	—	71–65	100–99	85–88	67–88	79–71	68–87				—	85–82	83–56				68–87	
Copenhagen	79–84	87–93	102–95	—	83–92	61–103	81–110	77–103	62–73	97–96				—						84–96
EBAA	78–93	65–92	63–78	87–68	—	78–115		69–79	68–82	73–79	86–78				—					87–84
Horsens	109–48	70–103	96–64	107–75	95–57	—	75–65	78–59	97–67	95–85						—	105–107	93–86	94–103	
Randers Cimbria	113–85	81–80	99–71	114–71	95–64	96–91	—	90–75	88–84	95–85		96–84					—	88–82	88–94	
Svendborg Rabbits	101–87	73–102	87–70	98–73	101–91	83–88	74–89	—	77–72	82–96						76–82	72–74	—	82–79	
Team FOG Næstved	94–71	76–93	81–77	103–64	86–50	73–85	86–79	69–79	—	98–76		79–80					79–98		—	
Værløse Blue Hawks	82–74	71–85	96–93	88–75	86–69	73–93	91–102	70–94	83–100	—			88–84							—

Updated to match(es) played on 7 March 2020. Source: Basketligaen
Legend: Blue = home team win; Red = away team win.

== Playoffs ==
The playoffs were not played as all games were cancelled in March.

== Danish clubs in European competitions ==
Team	Competition	Result
Bakken Bears	Champions League	First qualifying round
Bakken Bears	FIBA Europe Cup	Semifinals (Note: The FIBA Europe Cup was cancelled due to the coronavirus pandemic.)
