= Geof Kotila =

American basketball coach (1959–2023)

Personal information
- Born: 24 February 1959
- Died: 20 March 2023 (aged 64)
- Listed height: 6 ft 4 in (1.93 m)

Career information
- High school: Glen Lake (Maple City, Michigan)
- College: Michigan Tech (1978–1982)
- Coaching career: 1985–2013

Career history

Coaching
- 1985–1987: Michigan Tech (assistant)
- 1987–1994: Michigan Tech
- 1995–2002: Horsens IC
- 2002–2006: Skovbakken Bears
- 2006–2008: Snæfell
- 2008–2013: Team Fog Næstved

Career highlights
- As coach: Basketligaen champion (1998, 2004, 2005); Danish Cup (1996); Icelandic Cup (2008); Icelandic Company Cup (2007); Basketligaen Coach of the Year (2005, 2011); Danish All-Star Game Coach (2004–2006, 2011)

Geoffry Claude Kotila (24 February 1959 – 20 March 2023) was an American basketball coach and player. He played college basketball for Michigan Tech before going into coaching.

== Playing career ==
Kotila played high school basketball at Glen Lake School in Maple City, Michigan, before enrolling at Michigan Technological University. He was a four-year starter for the Huskies, earning the team's outstanding newcomer honors in 1978–79, garnering the team's most improved player award in 1980–81 as well as team MVP honors and the Raymond L. Smith Award as the university's outstanding senior male student-athlete in the 1981–82 campaign. In 1981–82, he also earned All-GLIAC (Great Lakes Intercollegiate Athletic Conference) first team honors. Kotila scored 1,394 points in 102 games for MTU. He ranked third all-time in career points, when his playing career at Michigan Tech came to an end in 1982. In 2002, Kotila was inducted into the Michigan Tech Sports Hall of Fame.

== Coaching career ==
From 1985 to 1986, Kotila served as head men's cross country coach at Michigan Tech and was an assistant men's basketball coach between 1985 and 1987, before being appointed MTU head men's basketball coach. He stayed on the job until 1994 and had a record of 82 wins and 120 losses. He went to Denmark, where he coached in the pro ranks. From 1995 to 2002, Kotila served as head coach of Horsens IC in the country's top division Basketliga, leading the team to a Danish national championship title in 1998 and a Danish cup title in 1996. During his four-year stint at Skovbakken Bears (2002–2006), Kotila won the Danish championship in 2004 and 2005, and the Danish Cup in 2005. In the 2004–05 season, he was recognized with Danish Basketliga Coach of the Year honors. He also coached the Bears in their first ever appearance in the EuroCup.

In May 2006, Kotila signed a two-year deal with Snæfell of the Icelandic Úrvalsdeild karla. During his first season, the team ended with the third best record in the league before a 76–74 overtime loss in game five in its best-of-five semi-finals series against KR in the Úrvalsdeild playoffs brought the season to a close. In the 2007–08 season, he led Snæfell to winning the Icelandic Cup and to the runner-up spot in league play.

Kotila left the team afterwards, returning to Denmark, where he was named head coach of Team Fog Næstved in June 2008. In his five-year stint at Næstved, Kotila was named Basketliga Coach of the Year in the 2010–11 season and guided the team to a third-place finish in the national championship in the 2011–12 campaign, which was the best result in club history. Following the conclusion of the 2012–13 season, Kotila decided to step down as Næstved head coach. Besides his job as head coach in the pro ranks, Kotila worked alongside Craig Pedersen as basketball coach and English teacher at EVN (Efterskolen ved Nyborg) school in Nyborg, Denmark since 2008.

In 2016, he started working as a business developer for Denmark's top flight Basketligaen, before taking over the job as Basketligaen commissioner in 2017.

Kotila died on March 20, 2023, at the age of 64. He was survived by his wife and their two daughters.
