= Jimmy Moore (basketball, born 1973) =

American basketball player and coach

Personal information
- Born: January 30, 1973 (age 53) Los Angeles, California, U.S.
- Listed height: 6 ft 8 in (2.03 m)

Career information
- High school: Redwood (Visalia, California); Lemoore (Lemoore, California)
- College: Dixie Junior College; Nevada (1993–1995)
- NBA draft: 1995: undrafted
- Playing career: 1995–present
- Position: Forward

Career history

Playing
- 1995–1996: Dudelange
- 1996–1997: Budapesti Honvéd SE
- 1997–1998: Povo de Esgueira
- 1998–1999: Estrelas
- 1999: Śląsk Wrocław
- 1999–2001: Zhejiang Golden Bulls
- 2001–2002: Værløse
- 2002–2003: BF Copenhagen

Coaching
- 2010–???: El Diamante High School
- 2018–2020: Randers Cimbria
- 2020–2022: Svendborg Rabbits
- 2022–2023: Randers Cimbria

Career highlights
- Basketligaen Coach of the Year 2019–20, 2020–21, 2022–23

Jimmy Gastion Bridgers Moore (born January 30, 1973) is an American basketball coach and former professional basketball player.

== Career ==
Born in Los Angeles, Moore grew up in Southern California. He played basketball at Redwood High School, before transferring to Lemoore High School. While attending Dixie Junior College in St. George, Utah, Moore "was accused of date rape", according to The Washington Post. The Associated Press reported, that "rape charges weren't filed because prosecutors couldn't prove it didn't involve consensual sex. Moore pleaded guilty to a misdemeanor charge of disorderly conduct."

A 6'8 forward, Moore transferred to the University of Nevada in 1993. He was Nevada's leading scorer in 1993–94, averaging 19.2 points per contest and also pulled down 8.2 rebounds per outing. He was subsequently named to the All-Big West Second Team. In 1994–95, he grabbed a team-high 6.8 rebounds a game. In November 1994, he was arrested "on suspicion of three misdemeanor battery charges involving an attack on a woman", according to The New York Times. Moore denied the allegations. In March 1995, he was sentenced to six months in jail. In July 1995, Moore was freed from house arrest.

Moore played professionally in China (Zhejiang Golden Bulls, CBA), Hungary (Budapesti Honvéd SE, 1996–1997), Luxembourg, Portugal (Illabum; Povo de Esgueira, 1997–98; Estrelas, 1998–1999), Poland (Śląsk Wrocław, 1999–2000), and Denmark (Værløse/Farum, 2001–2002; BF Copenhagen, 2002–2003). He played in the FIBA Korać Cup with Honvéd. In the 1997-98 season, Moore won the Portuguese cup competition Taça da Liga with Povo de Esgueira and was named Most valuable player of the Portuguese league LCB. With Esgueira, he participated in the FIBA Korać Cup and played in the FIBA Saporta Cup with Estrelas in 1998-99. While under contract at Śląsk Wrocław, Moore also saw action in the FIBA Saporta Cup. In 2002, he captured the Danish national championship and the Danish cup competition with Værløse/Farum. In the 2002-03 season, Moore won the Danish cup competition with Copenhagen, scoring 25 points in the final against the Bakken Bears. With the Danish team BF Copenhagen, he participated in the European club competition FIBA Champions Cup, besides games in the domestic league. While playing in Europe, he also got into coaching, working as youth coach for the clubs he played for. His last stop as a professional basketball player was at BF Copenhagen (Denmark) in the 2002-03 season. When the team went bankrupt, he returned to the US. In 2010, he was named head boys basketball coach at El Diamante High School in Visalia, California.

In 2018, Moore accepted the head coaching job at Randers Cimbria in Denmark's Basketligaen. He received Basketligaen Coach of the Year honors in 2019–20. Moore had coached Randers to a 19–5 record, his team was sitting in second place of the Basketligaen table, when the 2019–20 season was stalled due to the COVID-19 pandemic. After two years at Randers, Moore signed with fellow Basketligaen side Svendborg Rabbits in May 2020. He guided Svendborg to a third-place finish in the 2020–21 season and was named Basketligaen Coach of the Year the second straight year. In April 2022, Moore won the Danish Cup title with Svendborg. He left the Rabbits in June 2022 for personal reasons.

In July 2022, he signed with Randers Cimbria of Denmark's Basketligaen returning for a second stint in charge at the club. He helped the club to a bronze medal in the 2022–23 Basketligaen season and for the third time in his career was the recipient of the Basketligaen Coach of the Year distinction. Moore parted ways with Randers Cimbria in 2023.
