= 2020–21 Basketligaen =

Basketligaen
- Season: 2020–21
- Duration: 2 October 2020 – 27 May 2021
- Teams: 10

Regular season
- Season MVP: QJ Peterson (Bakken Bears)

Finals
- Champions: Bakken Bears (19th title)
- Runners-up: Horsens IC
- Finals MVP: Michel Diouf (Bakken Bears)

The 2020–21 Basketligaen was the 46th season of the highest professional basketball tier in Denmark. The season started don 2 October 2020 and ended 27 May 2021. Bakken Bears won its nineteenth national championship, its fifth consecutive title.

== Competition format ==
Teams were divided into two groups: Pro A, joined by the best five teams in the previous season, and Pro B, by the rest of the team. Each team would play against each other of their same league four times, while only twice with teams from the other side.

The five teams of Pro A and the best three of Pro B qualified for playoffs.

== Teams ==
Location of teams in 2020–21 Basketligaen

Team	City	Arena
BK Amager	Copenhagen	Amagerhallen
Bakken Bears	Aarhus	Vejlby-Risskov Hallen
Bears Academy	Aarhus	Vejlby-Risskov Hallen
BMS Herlev Wolfpack	Copenhagen	Skovlundehallen
Copenhagen	Copenhagen	Nørrebrohallen
Horsens IC	Horsens	Forum Horsens
Randers Cimbria	Randers	Arena Randers
Svendborg Rabbits	Svendborg	Svendborg Idrætscenter
Team FOG Næstved	Næstved	Næstved Hallen
Værløse Blue Hawks	Værløse	Søndersøhallen

== Regular season ==
=== Pro A ===
Pos	Team	Pld	W	L	PF	PA	PD	Pts	Qualification
1	Bakken Bears	26	23	3	2740	2137	+603	46	Qualification to playoffs
2	Horsens	26	19	7	2416	2196	+220	38	Qualification to playoffs
3	Randers Cimbria	26	16	10	2557	2430	+127	32	Qualification to playoffs
4	Svendborg Rabbits	26	16	10	2364	2143	+221	32	Qualification to playoffs
5	Team FOG Næstved	26	14	12	2115	2079	+36	28	Qualification to playoffs

Updated to match(es) played on 18 April 2021. Source: Basketligaen

=== Pro B ===
Pos	Team	Pld	W	L	PF	PA	PD	Pts	Qualification
1	Værløse Blue Hawks	22	11	11	1822	1897	−75	22	Qualification to playoffs
2	BMS Herlev Wolfpack	22	9	13	1728	1893	−165	18	Qualification to playoffs
3	Bears Academy	22	7	15	1842	1938	−96	14	Qualification to playoffs
4	Copenhagen	22	4	18	1614	1964	−350	8	
5	BK Amager	22	1	21	1614	2145	−531	2	

Updated to match(es) played on 08 March 2021. Source: Basketligaen

== Playoffs ==
=== Quarter-finals ===
Bakken Bears vs. Bears Academy

6 April 2021

Bakken Bears	100–72	Bears Academy

9 April 2021

Bears Academy	77–100	Bakken Bears

13 April 2021

Bakken Bears	135–69	Bears Academy
Bakken win series, 3–0

Horsens vs. BMS Herlev Wolfpack

6 April 2021

Horsens	112–72	BMS Herlev Wolfpack

10 April 2021

BMS Herlev Wolfpack	68–85	Horsens

13 April 2021

Horsens	92–81	BMS Herlev Wolfpack
Horsens win series, 3–0

Randers Cimbria vs. Værløse Blue Hawks

5 April 2021

Randers Cimbria	105–88	Værløse Blue Hawks

10 April 2021

Værløse Blue Hawks	106–115	Randers Cimbria

12 April 2021

Randers Cimbria	99–91	Værløse Blue Hawks
Randers win series, 3–0

Svendborg Rabbits vs. Team FOG Næstved

5 April 2021

Svendborg Rabbits	80–79 (OT)	Team FOG Næstved

8 April 2021

Team FOG Næstved	78–85	Svendborg Rabbits

12 April 2021

Svendborg Rabbits	102–97	Team FOG Næstved
Svendborg win series, 3–0

=== Semi-finals ===
Bakken Bears vs. Svendborg Rabbits

22 April 2021

Bakken Bears	106–90	Svendborg Rabbits

26 April 2021

Svendborg Rabbits	101–119	Bakken Bears

29 April 2021

Bakken Bears	102–85	Svendborg Rabbits
Bakken win series, 3–0

Horsens vs. Randers Cimbria

22 April 2021

Horsens	98–88	Randers Cimbria

26 April 2021

Randers Cimbria	100–92	Horsens

13 April 2021

Horsens	120–92	Randers Cimbria

3 May 2021

Randers Cimbria	vs.	Horsens

6 May 2021

Horsens	vs.	Randers Cimbria

== Statistics ==
Category	Player	Team(s)	Statistic
Points per game	QJ Peterson	Bakken Bears	21.8
Rebounds per game	Tyler Creammer	Copenhagen	12.2
Assists per game	Marius Kirkholt Sørensen	Bears Academy	9.5
Steals per game	Nicklas Jønsson	Copenhagen	2.3
Blocks per game	Koch Bar	Værløse Blue Hawks	2.2
Turnovers per game	Nicklas Jønsson	Copenhagen	5.0
2-points made per game	Gage Davis	Horsens IC	6.6
3-points made per game	QJ Peterson	Bakken Bears	3.0

Statistics after the regular season.

== Danish clubs in European competitions ==
Team	Competition	Result
Bakken Bears	Champions League	Regular season
