= Chanan Colman =

Danish-Israeli basketball player (born 1984)

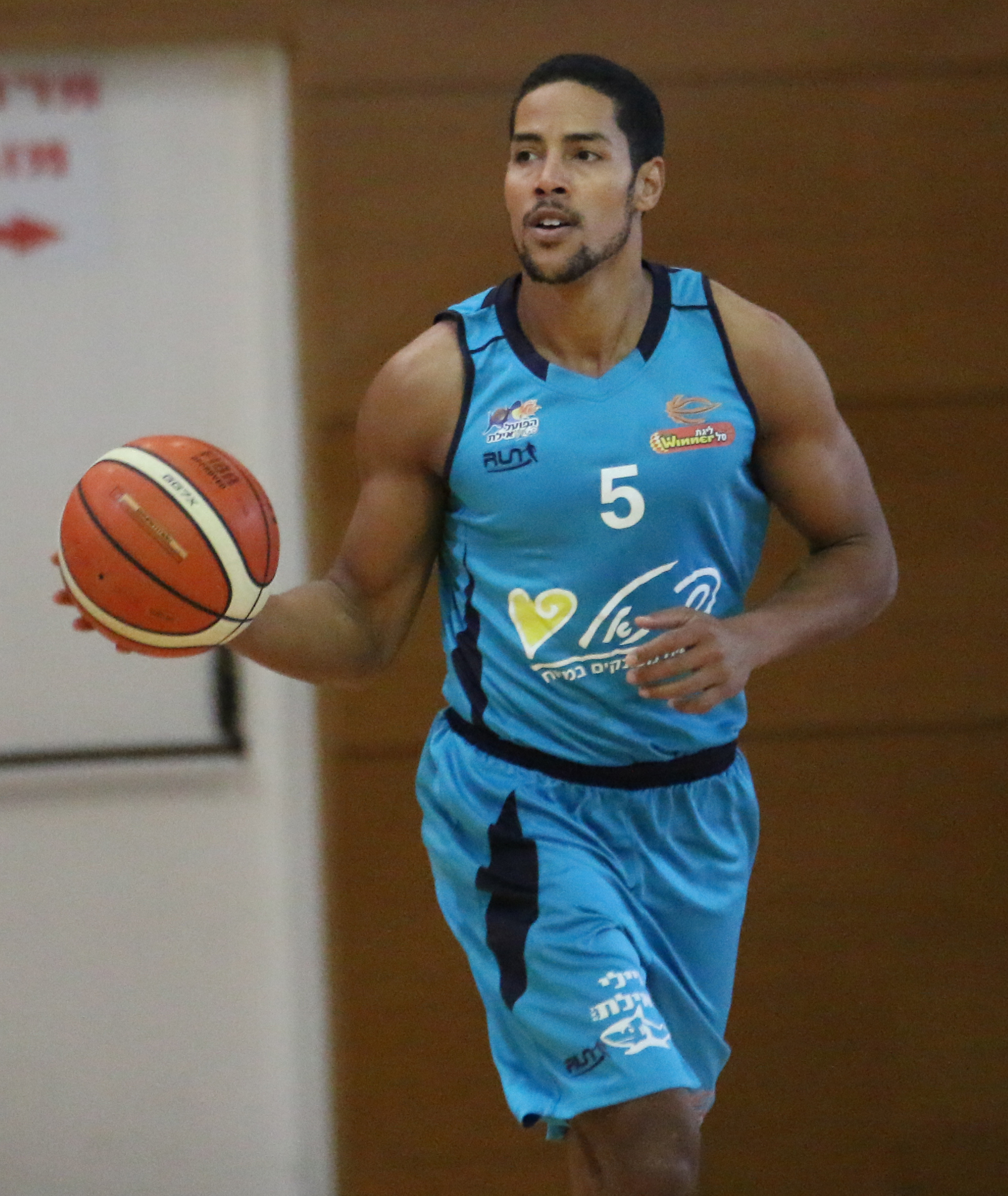
- Colman playing for Hapoel Eilat in March 2017

No. 55 – Hapoel Haifa
- Position: Point guard / shooting guard
- League: Israeli National League

Personal information
- Born: 10 March 1984 (age 42) Gladsaxe, Denmark
- Listed height: 6 ft 2 in (1.88 m)
- Listed weight: 203 lb (92 kg)

Career information
- College: Chipola (2002–2004)
- NBA draft: 2004: undrafted
- Playing career: 2004–present

Career history
- 2004–2006: Lappeenrannan NMKY
- 2006–2007: Ironi Ashkelon
- 2007–2008: Hapoel Gilboa Afula
- 2008: Roskilde
- 2008–2009: Lappeenrannan NMKY
- 2009–2010: Espoon Honka
- 2010–2012: Svendborg Rabbits
- 2012–2013: Maccabi Haifa
- 2013–2014: Hapoel Jerusalem
- 2014: Maccabi Rishon LeZion
- 2014: Randers Cimbria
- 2014–2016: Maccabi Haifa
- 2016–2017: Hapoel Eilat
- 2017–2018: Hapoel Holon
- 2018–2019: Hapoel Be'er Sheva
- 2019–2021: Copenhagen Wolfpack
- 2021: Hapoel Haifa

Career highlights
- 2× Finnish League champion (2005, 2006); Finnish League Finals MVP (2006); 3× Finnish Cup winner (2005, 2006, 2008); Danish League MVP (2012); Israeli League champion (2013); Israeli Cup winner (2018); 2× Israeli League All-Star (2015, 2019)

Chanan Safir Colman (Hebrew: חנן ספיר קולמן; born 10 March 1984) is a Danish-Israeli professional basketball player who last played for Hapoel Haifa of the Israel Basketball Premier League. He played college basketball for Chipola before playing professionally in Finland, Israel, and Denmark. Colman was named the Finnish League Finals MVP in 2006 and the Danish League MVP in 2012.

== Personal life ==
Colman was born in Gladsaxe, Denmark to an Israeli mother and an African American father. He started playing basketball when he was 9 years old. During an interview in 2017, Chanan revealed that he speaks three languages: Danish, English and Hebrew.

Since 2014, Colman has run a basketball camp for children in Denmark aged 8–19, named Camp Colman, which hosts hundreds of children each year.

In 2021, Colman began dating British singer/songwriter Jessie J. On 6 January 2023, the couple announced they were expecting their first baby together later in the year. Their son, Sky Safir Cornish Colman, was born in May 2023. In July 2026, Jessie and Chanan decided to end their relationship after 5 years together.

== Professional career ==
=== Early years (2004–2010) ===
In 2004, Colman started his professional career with the Finnish team Lappeenrannan NMKY. In his first two seasons in Lappeenranta, Colman won the Finnish League and the Finnish Cup for two consecutive years. He was also named the 2006 Finnish League Finals MVP.

On 7 September 2006, Colman signed with the Israeli team Ironi Ashkelon for the 2006–07 season. On 19 November 2006, Colman recorded a career-high 26 points, shooting 8-of-11 from the field in a 78–86 loss to Hapoel Jerusalem. On 25 December 2006, Colman received an Israeli passport.

On 30 August 2007, Colman signed a one-year deal with Hapoel Gilboa Afula.

=== Svendborg Rabbits (2010–2012) ===
On 1 July 2010, Colman signed a two-year deal with Danish team Svendborg Rabbits. On 16 February 2012, Colman tied his career-high 26 points, shooting 11-of-14 from the field, along with four rebounds and seven assists in a 109–94 win over Copenhagen Wolfpack. In his second season with Svendborg, Colman was named the Basketligaen MVP and led Svendborg to the 2012 Basketligaen Finals, where they eventually lost to Bakken Bears. In 40 games played for Svendborg, he averaged 15.6 points, 4.5 assists, 4 rebounds and 1.1 steals per game.

=== Maccabi Haifa (2012–2013) ===
On 8 August 2012, Colman signed with Maccabi Haifa for the 2012–2013 season. That season, Colman won the 2013 Israeli League Championship with Haifa.

=== Hapoel Jerusalem / Rishon LeZion (2013–14) ===
On 31 July 2013, Colman signed with Hapoel Jerusalem for the 2013–2014 season. However, on 19 February 2014, Colman parted ways with Jerusalem and signed with Maccabi Rishon LeZion for the rest of the season.

=== Randers Cimbria (2014) ===
On 4 July 2014, Colman signed with the Danish team Randers Cimbria. However, On 5 December 2014, he parted ways with the team after appearing in nine games.

=== Return to Maccabi Haifa (2014–2016) ===
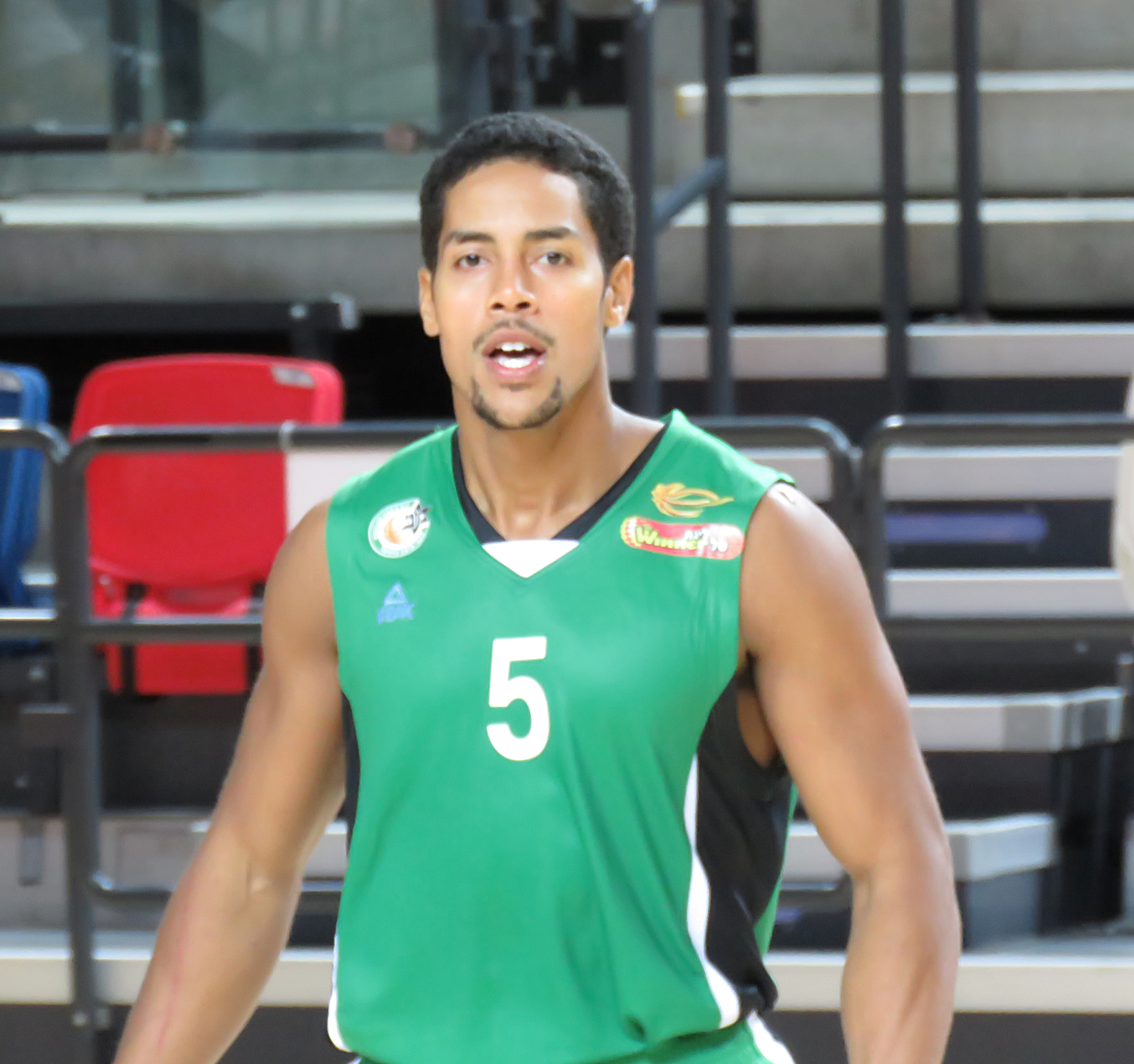
Colman with Maccabi Haifa in September 2015

On 5 December 2014, Colman signed a one-year deal with Maccabi Haifa. On 3 March 2015, Colman participated in the 2015 Israeli League All-Star Game and the Three-Point Shootout during the same event.

On 3 June 2015, Colman signed a two-year contract extension with Maccabi Haifa. That season, Colman was named Maccabi Haifa's team captain. In 35 games played during the 2015–16 season, he averaged 9.6 points, 2.8 rebounds, 2.5 assists and 1.6 steals.

=== Hapoel Eilat (2016–2017) ===
On 21 July 2016, Colman signed with Hapoel Eilat for the 2016–2017 season. Colman helped Eilat reach the 2017 Israeli League Playoffs as the second seed, but they eventually were eliminated by his former team Maccabi Rishon LeZion.

=== Hapoel Holon (2017–2018) ===
On 15 July 2017, Colman signed with Hapoel Holon for the 2017–2018 season. Colman won the 2018 Israeli State Cup with Holon, as well as reaching the 2018 Israeli League Final, where they eventually lost to Maccabi Tel Aviv.

=== Hapoel Be'er Sheva (2018–2019) ===
On 30 July 2018, Colman a one-year deal signed with Hapoel Be'er Sheva, joining his former head coach Rami Hadar. On 2 January 2019, Colman recorded a double-double with a season-high 20 points and 11 rebounds, shooting 6-of-7 from three-point range, along with two assists and three steals in an 82–68 win over Hapoel Gilboa Galil. Colman helped Be'er Sheva reach the 2019 Israeli League Playoffs, where they eventually were eliminated by Hapoel Jerusalem in the Quarterfinals.

=== BMS Herlev Wolfpack (2019–2021) ===
On 13 September 2019, Colman returned to Denmark to sign with the Copenhagen Wolfpack of the Danish Basketligaen.

=== Hapoel Haifa (2021–present) ===
On 12 March 2021, he signed with Hapoel Haifa of the Israel Basketball Premier League.

== Denmark national team ==
Colman was a member of the Denmark national team. He participated in the 2005 and 2007 EuroBasket qualification tournaments.

== See also ==
- Noam Yaacov, Danish-Israeli professional basketball player
