= Brandon Tabb =

American basketball player (born 1995)

No. 3 – Maccabi Mendal Petah Tikva
- Position: Shooting guard
- League: Liga Leumit

Personal information
- Born: December 25, 1995 (age 30) Hampton, Virginia, U.S.
- Listed height: 6 ft 4 in (1.93 m)
- Listed weight: 205 lb (93 kg)

Career information
- High school: Kecoughtan (Hampton, Virginia)
- College: C. of Central Florida (2014–2016); Bethune-Cookman (2016–2018)
- NBA draft: 2018: undrafted
- Playing career: 2018–present

Career history
- 2018–2019: Horsens IC
- 2019–2020: GTK Gliwice
- 2020–2021: Svendborg Rabbits
- 2021–2023: Norrköping Dolphins
- 2023–2024: Pieno žvaigždės Pasvalys
- 2024: CD Estela
- 2024–2025: Elitzur Yavne
- 2025: Paisas de Medellín
- 2026– present: מכבי מנדל פתח תקווה

Career highlights
- MEAC Player of the Year (2018); First-team All-MEAC (2018)

Brandon Tabb (born December 25, 1995) is an American professional basketball player for Paisas de Medellín of the Baloncesto Profesional Colombiano. He played college basketball for Bethune-Cookman.

== College career ==
Tabb attended Kecoughtan High School in Hampton, Virginia and averaged 19.8 points per game as a senior. Due to subpar academics, he did not qualify for Division I and attended the College of Central Florida in Ocala for two years, where he averaged 15.3 points per game as a sophomore. He transferred to Bethune-Cookman University in Daytona Beach, Florida and averaged 18 points per game as a junior. Tabb set a single-season record for three pointers as a junior at Bethune-Cookman with 106 treys. As a senior, he averaged 19 points per game. He scored 34 points against Coppin State and Morgan State. At the conclusion of the regular season Tabb was named MEAC Player of the Year.

== Professional career ==
On August 23, 2018, Tabb signed with Horsens IC of the Basketligaen. On July 3, 2019, he signed with GTK Gliwice of the PLK. Tabb averaged 14.5 points, 3.3 rebounds, 2.5 assists and 1.8 steals per game. On September 11, 2020, he signed with the Svendborg Rabbits of the Basketligaen. He averaged 17.7 points, 4.3 rebounds, 2.5 assists, and 1.9 steals per game. On August 1, 2021, Tabb signed with the Norrköping Dolphins, a Swedish team.

On August 2, 2023, he signed with Pieno žvaigždės Pasvalys of the Lithuanian Basketball League (LKL). On December 1, he was named Player of the Month for November.
