= Arnel Dedić =

Croatian basketball player and coach

Personal information
- Born: 31 January 1976 (age 49); Čapljina, Bosnia and Herzegovina

Arnel Dedić (born January 31, 1976) is a Bosnian-born Croatian basketball coach and former professional player.

== Career ==
=== Playing career ===
Born in Čapljina and a cousin of Jasmin Repeša, Dedić moved to Split at age 13 and played in the youth set-up of KK Split. With Split’s men’s team, he later played in the Croatian first division as well as in European club competition. A 196cm guard, Dedić also had stints at KK Slavonski Brod, KK Jolly Šibenik, KK Bosna Sarajevo and HKK Zrinjski Mostar in his playing career. In 2006, he signed with Horsens IC of Denmark’s top-flight Basketligaen. His parents and younger brother had fled from the war in Bosnia to Denmark in 1993. Dedić spent three years playing for the Horsens club before calling it a career.

=== Coaching career ===
In 2011, he was handed the head coaching job at Horsens IC. Dedić led HIC to Danish national championships titles in 2015 and 2016 and also captured the Danish cup competition with Horsens in 2015 and 2019. In the 2016-17 and 2017-18 seasons, his Horsens team finished as runners-up in the Danish championship. In 2011-12 and 2013-14, he coached HIC to third-place finishes in the Danish league. Dedić received Basketligaen Coach of the Year distinction in 2013, 2015 and 2018. He was dismissed by Horsens IC in May 2019 after game three of the Danish championship finals following an altercation with one of his player, Brandon Tabb, in the locker room. Prior to the 2019-20 campaign, Dedić was appointed head coach of fellow Basketligaen side Team FOG Næstved. He remained on the job until the conclusion of the 2020-21 season. In June 2021, he was named head coach of Denmark's men's national team. During his tenure, which ended in September 2022, Dedić guided Denmark to three wins and seven losses.

On July, 11th 2022, he was hired as head coach of Rapla KK of Estonia. Dedić parted ways with the team in December 2023.
