= Bonell Colas =

American basketball player

Bonell Colas (born August 16, 1982) is an American former professional basketball player.

== Career ==
Colas' parents moved from Haiti to Miami, Florida in the late 1970s. A 6 feet 9 inches (206 cm) power forward, he played basketball at North Miami High School, averaging 27.5 points and 12.3 rebounds a game as a senior. He enrolled at the University of Florida. Colas played for the Gators from 2000 to 2004, averaging 4.1 points and 2.6 rebounds per contest. His best season with the University of Florida came in 2003–04, when Colas had 4.9 points a game, while pulling down 3.1 rebounds per contest.

Colas started his professional career with the Panteras de Miranda in Venezuela. In 2006, he played for the Eugene Chargers in the International Basketball League.

He signed with Danish Basketligaen side Randers Cimbria in 2007 and had an immediate impact in the league, averaging 21.8 points, 12.2 rebounds, 1.4 blocks and 1.3 assists per contests in 27 games of the 2007–08 season. In his second year at Randers Cimbria (2008–09), Colas was named Basketligaen Player of the Year. He averaged 20.6 points, 14.3 rebounds, 2.4 blocks, 1.7 assists as well as 1.6 steals that season, helping the Randers team to a bronze medal in the Danish championship, which back then was the team's best ever result in the league.

Prior to the 2009–2010 season, he moved to Atomerőmű SE in Hungary, but was cut before the season started. In 2010–11, Colas played for Værløse BBK in Denmark and signed with fellow Basketligaen team Hørsholm 79'ers for the 2011–12 campaign.

Colas joined back Randers Cimbria in 2012 and stayed on the team until 2017. In the 2012–13 season, he was presented with the Basketligaen Defensive Player of the Year distinction following an outstanding season in which he had reached Basketligaen career highs 24.3 points and 14.7 rebounds a game to go along with 2.5 assists and 2.0 blocks per contest. In 2014, Colas reached the Basketligaen finals with Randers, where they fell to the Bakken Bears.

After his playing career, he started coaching at Hornbæk IF in Denmark.
