= Craig Pedersen =

Canadian basketball coach (born 1965)

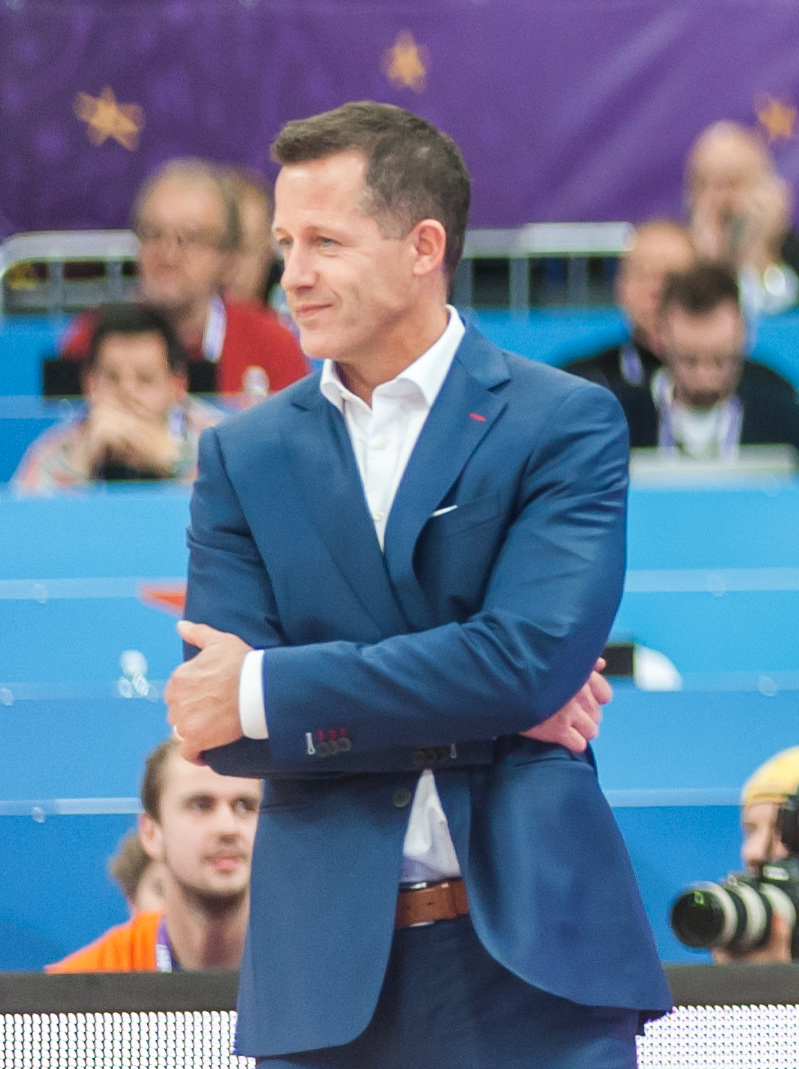
- Pedersen at EuroBasket 2017.

Iceland
- Title: Head coach

Personal information
- Born: June 13, 1965 (age 61)
- Listed height: 199 cm (6 ft 6 in)

Career information
- College: Simon Fraser University
- Playing career: 1989–2007
- Position: Forward
- Coaching career: 2003–present

Career history

Playing
- 1993–1994: Horsens BC
- 1994–2002: Horsens IC
- 2002–2003: Bakken Bears
- 2003–2007: Svendborg Rabbits

Coaching
- 2003–2015: Svendborg Rabbits
- 2004–2009: Denmark (assistant)
- 2014–present: Iceland

Career highlights
- As player: Danish Championship (1998); Danish League All-Import First Team (2000); As coach: Danish Championship (2010); 3x Danish Cup (2007, 2011, 2013)

Craig Pedersen (born June 13, 1965) is a Canadian basketball coach and the head coach of the Iceland national team, who he has led to EuroBasket three times, in 2015, 2017 and 2025. He is the longest tenured Iceland national teams coach in teams sports. He played and coached for several years in Denmark where he won the national championship twice, in 1998 as a player and in 2010 as a coach.

== Playing career ==
Pedersen played professionally in Denmark from 1989 to 2003 with Horsens BC, Horsens IC and Skovbakken, winning the Danish championship in 1998.

== Coaching career ==
He was the head coach of Svendborg Rabbits from 2003 to 2015 and an assistant coach to the Denmark men's national team from 2004 to 2009. In 2014, he was hired as the head coach of the Iceland men's national team.

On 22 November 2019, Pedersen signed a 3-year contract extension to continue with the Iceland national team.

On 9 November 2022, Pedersen signed another contract extension to continue with the Iceland national team until 2025.

On 23 February 2025, he led Iceland to its third EuroBasket appearance with its qualification to EuroBasket 2025.

== Personal life ==
Pedersen wife is Danish. Together, they have two children.
