= Værløse BBK =

Danish basketball club

Værløse Basketball Klub
- Nickname: Værløse Blue Hawks
- Leagues: Basketligaen
- Founded: 1972; 54 years ago
- Arena: Søndersøhallen and Farum Arena
- Capacity: 750 (Søndersøhallen) / 3000 (Farum Arena)
- Location: Værløse, Denmark
- Team colors: Blue and White
- Chairman: Mehmet Anik
- Head coach: Jonas Sørensen
- Assistants: Steen Guido, Anton Salling
- Championships: 3 (1996, 2002, 2003)
- Website: www.vbbk.dk
Home	Away

Værløse Basketball Klub (VBBK), is a Danish basketball club based in Værløse. The club was founded in 1972 and consists of many teams from youth to senior for all age groups. Their elite teams are better known as Værløse Blue Hawks and their mens team plays in the Basketligaen, which it rejoined in the 2018–19 season.

The club is known for its talent development in players as well as coaches. They prioritise youth players in their senior teams and give good opportunities for their young coaches. Many members of the club have played professionally and received scholarships to great universities in the US.

Their mens team, Værløse Blue Hawks, has one of the smallest budgets in the league but stay competitive by having mainly young Danish players and Danish coaches.

VBBK won the national championship for men in 1996, 2002 (Værløse/Farum) and 2003 (BF Copenhagen).

Before the start of the 2019-20 season, the mens team changed its name to Værløse Blue Hawks for branding purposes.

== Season by season ==
Champions	Runners-up	Playoff berth	Promoted

Season	Tier	League	Finish	Wins	Losses	Win%	Playoffs	Head coach
2000-01	1	Jordanligaen	2nd	14	6	.700	Lost the final against Skovbakken Bears 1-2	
2001-02	1	Jordanligaen	1st	17	5	.773	Won the final against Aabyhøj 2-0	
2002-03	1	Basketligaen	1st	20	2	0.909	Won the final against Bakken Bears 2-0	
2003-04							–	
2004-05							–	
2005-06							–	
2006-07	2	1. Division	9th	7	11	.388	–	
2007-08	2	1. Division	6th	7	6	.538	–	
2008-09	2	1. Division	3rd	14	8	.636	–	
2009-10	2	1. Division	4th	7	4	.636	–	
2010-11	1	Canal Digital Ligaen	8th	8	19	.296	Lost the quarterfinal to Svendborg Rabbits 0-2	
2011-12	1	Canal Digital Ligaen	7th	11	16	.407	Lost the quarterfinal to Svendborg Rabbits 0-3	
2012-13	1	Canal Digital Ligaen	8th	10	17	.370	Lost the quarterfinal to Svendborg Rabbits 0-3	
2013-14	1	Canal Digital Ligaen	10th	5	22	.185	–	
2014-15	1	Canal Digital Ligaen	9th	7	20	.259	–	
2015-16	2	1. Division	5th	12	10	.545	Lost the semifinal to Køge BK 0-2	Anders Sommer
2016-17	2	1. Division	2nd	13	5	.722	Lost the final to Wolfpack 1-2	Anders Sommer
2017-18	2	1. Division	1st	14	1	.933	Won the final against EBAA 2-1	Anders Sommer
2018–19	1	Basketligaen	8th	7	15	.318	Lost the quarterfinal to Bakken Bears 0–3	Susie Heede-Andersen
2019–20	1	Basketligaen	7th	9	11	.450	—N/a (cancelled)	Susie Heede-Andersen
2020–21	1	Basketligaen	6th	11	11	.500	Lost the quarterfinals to Randers Cimbria, 0–3	Susie Heede-Andersen
2021-22	1	Basketligaen	7th	6	12	.333	Won the Playoff B final against theView Copenhagen	Mathias Madsen
2022-23	1	Basketligaen	8th	7	13	.350	Lost the Playoff B final to BC Copenhagen	Mathias Madsen
2023-24	1	Basketligaen	6th	10	10	.500	Played in Playoff A but didn't make the semifinal	Jonas Sørensen
2024-25	1	Basketligaen	10th	5	15	.250	Played in Playoff B but didn't make the final	Jonas Sørensen
