= Basketligaen =

Premier Danish basketball league

- Founded: 1995; 31 years ago
- First season: 1995–96
- Country: Denmark
- Confederation: FIBA Europe
- Number of teams: 10
- Level on pyramid: 1
- Relegation to: First Division
- Domestic cup: Danish Cup
- International cup(s): Basketball Champions League; Europe Cup
- Current champions: Bakken Bears (24th title) (2025–26)
- Most championships: Bakken Bears (24 titles)
- TV partners: Sport Live
- Website: basketligaen.dk
- 2025–26 Basketligaen

The Basketligaen (literally "The Basketball League") is the highest professional basketball league in Denmark. The men’s first division was originally founded in 1957.

Over the years, the league has undergone several name changes due to sponsorship deals. It was formerly known as Canal Digital Ligaen, Jordanligaen, and Premierligaen, among other names, including Elitedivisionen and 1. division. The current iteration of the league was officially established in 1998, though it has occasionally operated without a sponsor name.

The Bakken Bears are the league’s all-time record holders, having won 18 titles. BMS is notable for securing 5 consecutive titles from 1986 to 1990. The league’s main TV partner is Sport Live.

The league consists of 11 teams, and notably, it does not follow a relegation system. In the 2021/2022 season, the league was consolidated into a single division once again. Initially, the league started with 10 teams, and it expanded to 11 in the 2022/23 season when Holbæk/Stenhus joined.

== 2024–25 teams ==
Location of teams in 2024–25 Basketligaen

Basketligaen
Team	Home city	Arena	Capacity
Bakken Bears	Aarhus	Vejlby Risskov Center	2,050
BC Copenhagen	Copenhagen	Nørrebrohallen	600
Bears Academy	Aarhus	Vejlby Risskov Center	2,050
BK Amager	Tårnby	Amagerhallen	1,500
BMS Herlev	Herlev	Skovlundehallen	1,000
Holdbæk Stenhus	Holbæk	Holbæk Sportsby	1,000
Horsens IC	Horsens	Forum Horsens	4,000
Randers Cimbria	Randers	Arena Randers	3,000
Svendborg Rabbits	Svendborg	Arena Svendborg	3,600
Team FOG Næstved	Næstved	Arena Næstved	3,500
Værløse Blue Hawks	Værløse	Søndersøhallen	750

== Title holders ==
- 1957–58: Aarhus
- 1958–59: Gladsaxe
- 1959–60: Gladsaxe
- 1960–61: SISU
- 1961–62: SISU
- 1962–63: Gladsaxe
- 1963–64: Gladsaxe
- 1964–65: Gladsaxe
- 1965–66: SISU
- 1966–67: SISU
- 1967–68: Gladsaxe
- 1968–69: Gladsaxe
- 1969–70: Virum
- 1970–71: Virum
- 1971–72: SISU
- 1972–73: SISU
- 1973–74: Falcon
- 1974–75: Falcon
- 1976–77: SISU
- 1973–74: Falcon
- 1977–78: Falcon
- 1978–79: Stevnsgade
- 1979–80: Stevnsgade
- 1980–81: SISU
- 1981–82: BMS
- 1982–83: SISU
- 1983–84: SISU
- 1984–85: SISU
- 1985–86: BMS
- 1986–87: BMS
- 1987–88: BMS
- 1988–89: BMS
- 1989–90: BMS
- 1990–91: Hørsholm
- 1991–92: Horsens
- 1992–93: Hørsholm
- 1993–94: Horsens
- 1994–95: Stevnsgade
- 1995–96: Værløse
- 1996–97: Skovbakken
- 1997–98: Horsens
- 1998–99: Skovbakken
- 1999–00: Skovbakken
- 2000–01: Skovbakken
- 2001–02: Værløse Farum
- 2002–03: Copenhagen
- 2003–04: Århus
- 2004–05: Skovbakken
- 2005–06: Horsens
- 2006–07: Skovbakken
- 2007–08: Bakken Bears
- 2008–09: Bakken Bears
- 2009–10: Svendborg Rabbits
- 2010–11: Bakken Bears
- 2011–12: Bakken Bears
- 2012–13: Bakken Bears
- 2013–14: Bakken Bears
- 2014–15: Horsens
- 2015–16: Horsens
- 2016–17: Bakken Bears
- 2017–18: Bakken Bears
- 2018–19: Bakken Bears
- 2019–20: Bakken Bears
- 2020–21: Bakken Bears
- 2021–22: Bakken Bears
- 2022–23: Bakken Bears
- 2023–24: Bakken Bears
- 2024–25: Bakken Bears
- 2025–26: Bakken Bears

== The finals ==
Champions 1995–2024						Finals	
Season	Teams	Gold	Silver	Bronze	Relegation	Score	Finals MVP
1995–96		Værløse/Farum (2)	Stevnsgade	Horsens IC			
1996–97		Bakken Bears (2)	Hørsholm	Stevnsgade			
1997–98		Horsens IC (3)	Bakken Bears	SISU BK			
1998–99		Bakken Bears (3)	SISU BK	Horsens IC			
1999-00		Bakken Bears (4)	Horsens IC	SISU BK			
2000–01		Bakken Bears (5)	Værløse/Farum	BK Skjold/Stevnsgade Basket		2–1	
2001–02		Værløse/Farum (3)	Aabyhøj IF	Bakken Bears		2–0	
2002–03	10	BF Copenhagen (2)	Bakken Bears	SISU BK	BF Copenhagen	2–0	
2003–04	10	Bakken Bears (6)	Horsens IC	Team Sjælland	BK Skjold/Stevnsgade Basket	3–1	
2004–05	10	Bakken Bears (7)	SISU BK	Svendborg Rabbits	Team Sjælland	3–2	
2005–06	11	Horsens IC (4)	Bakken Bears	BK Amager	Herlev	3–1	
2006–07	12	Bakken Bears (8)	Svendborg Rabbits	Horsens IC	AAB Basket, Horsens Basketball Club, Team Sjælland	3–0	
2007–08	9	Bakken Bears (9)	Svendborg Rabbits	BK Amager		4–0	
2008–09	10	Bakken Bears (10)	Svendborg Rabbits	Randers Cimbria	Roskilde Basketball Klub	4–3	
2009–10	10	Svendborg Rabbits	Bakken Bears	Hørsholm 79ers		4–1	
2010–11	10	Bakken Bears (11)	Svendborg Rabbits	Horsens IC		4–0	
2011–12	10	Bakken Bears (12)	Svendborg Rabbits	Team FOG Næstved		4–2	
2012–13	10	Bakken Bears (13)	Svendborg Rabbits	Horsens IC		4–3	(Denmark) Chris Christoffersen
2013–14	10	Bakken Bears (14)	Randers Cimbria	Horsens IC		4–0	(United States) Kenny Barker
2014–15	10	Horsens IC (5)	Bakken Bears	Team FOG Næstved	Aalborg Vikings, Værløse Basket (withdrew), Copenhagen Wolfpack (withdrew)	4–2	(Republic of Ireland) Brian Fitzpatrick
2015–16	8	Horsens IC (6)	Bakken Bears	Team FOG Næstved		4–3	(United States) Nimrod Hilliard
2016–17	8	Bakken Bears (15)	Horsens IC	Svendborg Rabbits	SISU BK (withdrew)	4–1	(Trinidad and Tobago) DeVaughn Akoon-Purcell
2017–18	8	Bakken Bears (16)	Horsens IC	Randers Cimbria		4–0	(United States) Jeffrey Crockett
2018–19	9	Bakken Bears (17)	Horsens IC	Team FOG Næstved		4–0	(United States) Tobin Carberry
2019–20	10	Bakken Bears (18)	Randers Cimbria	Horsens IC			No finals due to COVID-19 pandemic
2020–21	10	Bakken Bears (19)	Horsens IC	Svendborg Rabbits		4–2	(Senegal) Michel Diouf
2021–22	10	Bakken Bears (20)	Svendborg Rabbits	Horsens IC		4–0	(United States) Marvelle Harris
2022–23	11	Bakken Bears (21)	Team FOG Næstved	Randers Cimbria		4–0	(United States) Ryan Evans
2023–24	11	Bakken Bears (22)	Team FOG Næstved	Horsens IC		4–0	(Denmark) Gustav Knudsen
2024–25	11	Bakken Bears (23)	Svendborg Rabbits	Randers Cimbria		3–1	(United States) Urald King
2025–26	12	Bakken Bears (24)	Team FOG Næstved	Svendborg Rabbits		3–1	

== Awards ==
Season	MVP	Defensive Player of The Year	Young Player of The Year	Coach of The Year		Referee of The Year
2002–03	(United States) Eric Bell					
2003–04	(United States) Joshua Metzger			(Denmark) Mads Christensen	Svendborg Rabbits	
2004–05	(United States) Eric Bell (2)			(Canada) Craig Pedersen	Svendborg Rabbits	
2005–06	(Denmark) Thomas Skotting			(United States) Geof Kotila	Team FOG Næstved	
2006–07	(United States) Joshua Joel Buettner			(Denmark) Jesper Krone	BK Amager	
2007–08	(United States) Brandon Omar Thomas			(Spain) Roberto Velosa	Hørsholm 79ers	
2008–09	(United States) Bonell Colas			(Canada) Craig Pedersen (2)	Svendborg Rabbits	
2009–10	(United States) Johnell Smith		(Denmark) Mathias Seilund	(United States) Marc Collins	Randers Cimbria	(Denmark) Jakob Hors
2010–11	(Denmark) Nicolai Iversen	(Denmark) Nicolai Iversen	(Denmark) Jonathan Gilling	(Serbia) Milan Škobalj	Hørsholm 79ers	(Denmark) Bo Bundgaard
2011–12	(Denmark) Chanan Colman	(United States) Corin Henry	(Denmark) Philip Hertz	(United States) Geof Kotila (2)	Team FOG Næstved	(Denmark) Bo Bundgaard (2)
2012–13	(Denmark) Darko Jukić	(United States) Bonell Colas	(Denmark) Frederik Rungby	(Canada) Craig Pedersen (3)	Svendborg Rabbits	(Denmark) Morten Thomsen
2013–14	(United States) Johnell Smith (2)	(Denmark) Frederik Hougaard Nielsen	(Denmark) Peter Møller	(United Kingdom) James Vear	Aalborg Vikings	(Denmark) Morten Thomsen (2)
2014–15	(United States) Skyler Bowlin	(Senegal) Baye Keita	(Denmark) Gabriel Iffe Lundberg	(Croatia) Arnel Dedić	Horsens IC	(Denmark) Morten Thomsen (3)
2015–16	(United States) Brandon Rozzell	(Senegal) Michel Diouf	(Denmark) August Haas	(Spain) Israel Martín	Bakken Bears	(Denmark) Jakob Hors (2)
2016–17	(Trinidad and Tobago) DeVaughn Akoon-Purcell	(United States) Jyles Smith	(Denmark) Asbjørn Midtgaard	(United States) Jim Jabir	SISU BK	(Denmark) Jakob Hors (3)
2017–18	(Denmark) Kevin Larsen	(Senegal) Michel Diouf (2)	(Denmark) Filip Rajovic	(Croatia) Arnel Dedić (2)	Horsens IC	(Denmark) Morten Thomsen (4)
2018–19	(United States) Ryan Evans	(Senegal) Michel Diouf (3)	(Denmark) Sylvester Berg	(Denmark) Steffen Wich	Bakken Bears	(Denmark) Andrada Monika Csender
2019–20	(United States) Roberto Gallinat	(Senegal) Michel Diouf (4)	(Denmark) Jonathan Klussmann	(United States) Jimmy Moore	Randers Cimbria	(Denmark) Andrada Monika Csender (2)
2020–21	(United States) QJ Peterson	(Kenya) Tylor Ongwae	(Denmark) Magnus Møllgaard	(United States) Jimmy Moore (2)	Svendborg Rabbits	(Denmark) Andrada Monika Csender (3)
2021–22	(Denmark) Sebastian Åris	(Kenya) Tylor Ongwae (2)	(Denmark) Mads Bro Hansen	(Denmark) Anders Sommer	Bakken Bears	(Denmark) Carsten Kristensen
2022–23	(United States) Mike McGuirl	(United States) Bakary Camara	(Denmark) Gustav Knudsen	(United States) Jimmy Moore (3)	Randers Cimbria	(Denmark) Carsten Kristensen (2)
2023–24	(United States) Gage Davis	(South Sudan) (Canada) Kur Jongkuch	(Denmark) Magnus Høj Madsen	(Bosnia and Herzegovina) Vedran Borovcanin	Horsens IC	(Denmark) Carsten Kristensen (3)
2024–25	(United States) (Jamaica) Jagan Mosely	(Denmark) Olamide Pedersen	(Denmark) Gabriel Vogel	(Denmark) Mads Andersen	Svendborg Rabbits	(Denmark) Nikolai Norup
2025–26	(United States) Tymu Chenery	(United States) Isaiah Richards	(Denmark) Ogbemudia Uagboe	(Denmark) Jonas Sørensen	Værløse BBK	(Denmark) Christian Møller Hansen

== All-time Basketligaen table ==
The All-time Basketligaen table is an overall record of all match results of every team that has played in Basketligaen since 1958.

Last updated in June 2025.

Pos.	Team	1st	2nd	3rd	Total of medals
1	Bakken Bears	23	10	4	37
2	SISU BK	11	10	9	30
3	Horsens IC	6	7	10	23
4	Efterslægten BK	6	4	2	12
5	BMS	6	1	6	13
6	Falcon Basketball	4	8	4	16
7	Stevnsgade Basketball	3	5	9	17
8	Virum BK	2	–	6	8
9	Hørsholm 79ers	2	3	3	8
10	Værløse/Farum/BF Copenhagen	3	2	1	7
11	Gladsaxe Basketball Klub	1	1	3	5
12	Svendborg Rabbits	1	8	5	14
13	Viby Idræts Forening	–	3	3	6
14	Randers Cimbria	–	2	4	6
15	ABC	–	1	1	2
16	Åbyhøj BK	–	1	–	1
17	Team FOG Næstved	–	2	4	6
18	Glostrup Basketball	–	–	2	2
19	BK Amager	–	–	2	2
20	Team Sjælland	–	–	1	1

== Statistical leaders ==
Season	Points		Rebounds		Assists		Steals		Turnovers	
2002–03	(United States) Andy Wormsley (23.8)	Svendborg Rabbits	(United States) Marek Ondera (9.4)	Bakken Bears	(United States) Eric Bell (4.4)	Bakken Bears	(United States) Eric Bell (3.5)	Bakken Bears	(United States) Austin McKellar (4.5)	Hørsholm 79ers
2003–04	(United States) Steven Pettyjohn (28.4)	SISU BK	(United States) Jeff Markray (11.6)	Skjold Stevnsgade	(United States) Wayne Johnell Copeland (5.5)	Horsens IC	(United States) Wayne Johnell Copeland (5.0)	Horsens IC	(Denmark) Lasse Kristiansen (4.5)	AAB Basket
2004–05	(Guinea) Flagan Prince (24.1)	BK Amager	(United States) Brian Sigafoos (11.2)	Hørsholm 79ers	(United States) Eric Bell (6.4)	Horsens IC	(United States) Eric Bell (4.4)	Horsens IC	(Denmark) Lasse Kristiansen (4.3)	AAB Basket
2005–06	(United States) Joshua King (26.4)	Hørsholm 79ers	(United States) Monta McGhee (12.4)	Horsens IC	(Denmark) Martin Mariegaard (5.7)	Svendborg Rabbits	(United States) Spencer Ross (3.1)	Horsens IC	(Denmark) Alan Madsen (4.1)	Aabyhøj IF
2006–07	(United States) Anthony Paez (27.7)	AAB Basket	(United States) Monta McGhee (13.3)	Horsens IC	(United States) Tanoris Shepard (6.5)	Svendborg Rabbits	(United States) Dustin Pfeifer (2.9)	Team Sjælland	(Denmark) Andreas Bloch (4.3)	SISU BK
2007–08	(United States) Brandon Omar Thomas (24.6)	Team FOG Næstved	(Serbia) Ivan Mišković (12.2)	Horsens IC	(United States) Jarrett Howell (4.7)	Svendborg Rabbits	(United States) Jarrett Howell (2.9)	Svendborg Rabbits	(United States) James Duane (3.4)	Hørsholm 79ers
2008–09	(United States) Christopher Gilliam (24.6)	Åbyhøj BK	(United States) Bonell Colas (14.3)	Randers Cimbria	(United States) David Smedley (5.2)	Randers Cimbria	(United States) Jesse Pellot-Rosa (3.0)	SISU BK	(United States) Darnell Kirkwood (3.8)	Horsens IC
2009–10	(United States) Mychal Lamont Kearse (23.4)	SISU BK	(Denmark) Chris Christoffersen (9.7)	Bakken Bears	(United States) David Smedley (6.5)	Randers Cimbria	(United States) Johnell Smith (2.8)	Svendborg Rabbits	(United States) Mychal Lamont Kearse (3.5)	SISU BK
2010–11	(Denmark) Thomas Soltau (22.8)	SISU BK	(United States) Lee Roberts (13.3)	Team FOG Næstved	(United States) David Smedley (6.4)	Team FOG Næstved	(Denmark) Lasse Kristiansen (2.1)	Aalborg Vikings	(Denmark) Thomas Soltau (3.6)	SISU BK
2011–12	(United States) Ryan Devon White (24.8)	Aalborg Vikings	(United States) D'Mario Curry (11.6)	Åbyhøj BK	(Slovenia) Davor Sattler (5.4)	Horsens IC	(United States) Corin Henry (3.4)	Team FOG Næstved	(United States) D'Mario Curry (5.3)	Aabyhøj IF
2012–13	(United States) Bonell Colas (24.3)	Randers Cimbria	(United States) Bonell Colas (14.7)	Randers Cimbria	(Spain) Miguel Ortega (6.8)	Randers Cimbria	(United States) Skyler Bowlin (3.00)	Horsens IC	(Spain) Miguel Ortega (3.7)	Randers Cimbria
2013–14	(Canada) Joey Haywood (25.0)	Aalborg Vikings	(United States) Durell Vinson (15.2)	Falcon Basketball	(United States) Johnell Smith (5.8)	Svendborg Rabbits	(United States) Skyler Bowlin(2.65)	Horsens IC	(Canada) Alex Murphy (3.3)	Team FOG Næstved
2014–15	(United States) Darryl Partin (27.0)	SISU BK	(United States) Bonell Colas (12.6)	Randers Cimbria	(Argentina) Antonio Porta (7.1)	Svendborg Rabbits	(United States) Marquis Addison (2.4)	Horsens IC	(Denmark) Chris Marius Nielsen (4.0)	Randers Cimbria
2014–15	(United States) Darryl Partin (27.0)	SISU BK	(United States) Bonell Colas (12.6)	Randers Cimbria	(Argentina) Antonio Porta (7.1)	Svendborg Rabbits	(United States) Skyler Bowlin (2.4)	Horsens IC	(Denmark) Chris Marius Nielsen (4.0)	Randers Cimbria
2015–16	(United States) Brandon Rozzell (24.5)	Svendborg Rabbits	(United States) Evan Yates (9.9)	Hørsholm 79ers	(United States) Brandon Rozzell (5.8)	Svendborg Rabbits	(United States) Troy Franklin (2.2)	Team FOG Næstved	(United States) Brandon Rozzell (3.7)	Svendborg Rabbits
2016–17	(Trinidad and Tobago) DeVaughn Akoon-Purcell (21.4)	Bakken Bears	(United States) Tanner McGrew (10.5)	SISU BK	(Denmark) Frederik Hougaard Nielsen (6.5)	Hørsholm 79ers	(United States) Myles Mack (2.1)	Horsens IC	(Denmark) Chris Marius Nielsen (4.2)	Randers Cimbria
2017–18	(United States) Matt Bonds (22.4)	Hørsholm 79ers	(United States) Durell Vinson (12.8)	Copenhagen Wolfpack	(Denmark) Frederik Hougaard Nielsen (6.0)	Hørsholm 79ers	(United States) Troy Franklin (2.2)	Team FOG Næstved	(Denmark) Filip Rajovic (3.4)	Stevnsgade Basketball
2018–19	(United States) Deionte Simmons (20.1)	Wolfpack	(United States) Richard Granberry (9.6)	Værløse Blue Hawks	(Denmark) Sebastian Petersen (5.2)	Svendborg Rabbits	(United States) Derrick Wilson (2.8)	Svendborg Rabbits	(Denmark) Oliver Stroh (4.3)	Wolfpack
2018–19	(United States) Deionte Simmons (20.1)	Wolfpack	(United States) Richard Granberry (9.6)	Værløse Blue Hawks	(United States) Derrick Wilson (5.2)	Svendborg Rabbits	(United States) Derrick Wilson (2.8)	Svendborg Rabbits	(Denmark) Oliver Stroh (4.3)	Wolfpack
2019–20	(Denmark) Filip Rajovic (20.8)	Copenhagen	(Australia) Louis Timms (10.8)	Amager	(United States) Javion Blake (5.7)	Wolfpack	(Canada) Jahmal Jones (2.1)	Team FOG Næstved	(Denmark) Liam Churchill (3.8)	Bears Academy
2020–21	(United States) QJ Peterson (21.9)	Bakken Bears	(United States) Tyler Creammer (12)	Copenhagen	(Denmark) Marius Kirkholt (8.5)	Bears Academy	(Denmark) Magnus Mollgaard (2.3)	Bears Academy	(Denmark) Nicklas Jonsson (4.9)	Copenhagen
2021–22	(United States) Zeke Moore (20.1)	Copenhagen	(United States) Durell Vinson (11.8)	Copenhagen	(Denmark) Sebastian Åris (6.1)	Svendborg Rabbits	(Spain) Andrew Ramirez (2.8)	Copenhagen	(Denmark) Magnus Bjørnå (3.5)	Amager
2022–23	(United States) Mike McGuirl (21.7)	Team FOG Næstved	(United States) Eysan Wiley (11)	Holdbæk Stenhus	(United States) Brandon Norfleet (7.5)	Randers Cimbria	(Denmark) August Haas (2.6)	BMS Herlev	(United States) Eysan Wiley (3.9)	Holdbæk Stenhus
2023–24	(United States) Andrew Sims (25.7)	Amager	(United States) Kevin Marfo (14.6)	Svendborg Rabbits	(Denmark) Adam Heede-Andersen (6.5)	Værløse Blue Hawks	(United States) Bakary Camara (2.3)	Randers Cimbria	(Denmark) Tomas Atli Bjarkason (4.5)	Amager
2024–25	(United States) Caden Ebeling (24.7)	Amager	(United States) Caden Ebeling (13.1)	Amager	(Denmark) Darko Jukić (6.1)	Bakken Bears	(United States) Isaiah Burnett (3.5)	Amager	(United States) Avery Anderson III (3.7)	Randers Cimbria

Source: Eurobasket.com, Basketligaen.dk

== All-time leaders ==
Last updated June 1, 2018.

	Player		Team
Points	(Denmark) Chris Marius Nielsen	6,385	17 seasons (Still active). Randers Cimbria (2002–2010, 2012–), Bakken Bears (2010–2013)
Rebounds	(United States) Bonell Colas	2,600	10 seasons. Randers Cimbria (2007–2009, 2012–2017), Hørsholm 79ers (2011–2012), Værløse Basket (2010–2011)
Assists	(Denmark) Frederik Hougaard Nielsen	1,478	12 seasons (Still active). Hørsholm 79ers (2005–2011, 2013–), Bakken Bears (2011–2013)
Steals	(Denmark) Chris Marius Nielsen	560	17 seasons (Still active). Randers Cimbria (2002–2010, 2012–), Bakken Bears (2010–2013)
Blocks	(Denmark) Chris Christoffersen	550	13 seasons (Still active). Bakken Bears (2004–)
2-points made	(United States) Bonell Colas	1,620	10 seasons. Randers Cimbria (2007–2009, 2012–2017), Hørsholm 79ers (2011–2012), Værløse Basket (2010–2011)
3-points made	(Denmark) Chris Marius Nielsen	828	17 seasons (Still active). Randers Cimbria (2002–2010, 2012–), Bakken Bears (2010–2013)
Free throws made	(Denmark) Chris Marius Nielsen	1,609	17 seasons (Still active). Randers Cimbria (2002–2010, 2012–), Bakken Bears (2010–2013)
Turnovers	(Denmark) Chris Marius Nielsen	1,083	17 seasons (Still active). Randers Cimbria (2002–2010, 2012–), Bakken Bears (2010–2013)
Minutes played	(Denmark) Chris Marius Nielsen	12,422	17 seasons (Still active). Randers Cimbria (2002–2010, 2012–), Bakken Bears (2010–2013)
Games played	(Denmark) Chris Marius Nielsen	417	17 seasons (Still active). Randers Cimbria (2002–2010, 2012–), Bakken Bears (2010–2013)

Stats since 2002.

== Single game records ==
Last updated June 1, 2018.

	Player		Team	Date	Game			
Points	(United States) Brandon Omar Thomas	49	Team FOG Næstved	01/23-2008	Team FOG Næstved	vs	Åbyhøj BK	104:92
Rebounds	(United States) Durell Vinson	28	Falcon Basketball	11/30-2013	Falcon Basketball	vs	Hørsholm 79ers	83:86
Assists	(Iceland) Arnar Jónsson	16	BC Aarhus	09/22-2012	BC Aarhus	vs	Aalborg Vikings	97:90
Steals	(United States) Wayne Johnell Copeland	12	Horsens IC	03/14-2004	Horsens IC	vs	Åbyhøj BK	97:52
Blocks	(United States) Nicholas Billings	10	Hørsholm 79ers	02/23-2008	Svendborg Rabbits	vs	Hørsholm 79ers	89:77
Blocks	(Denmark) Mikkel Langager Larsen	10	Horsens IC	03/17-2004	Åbyhøj BK	vs	Horsens IC	72:88
2-points made	(United States) Jason Siggers	18	Bakken Bears	12/13-2007	Åbyhøj BK	vs	Bakken Bears	73:92
3-points made	(United States) Jeff Schiffner	10	Bakken Bears	04/26-2005	SISU	vs	Bakken Bears	84:105
3-points made	(Spain) Damian Jimenez Ocana	10	Svendborg Rabbits	03/07-2016	Svendborg Rabbits	vs	Randers Cimbria	114:62
Free throws made	(United States) Gregory William Lacasse	20	Horsens IC	12/09-2006	Team FOG Næstved	vs	Horsens IC	91:77
Free throws made	(Denmark) Alan Madsen	20	Åbyhøj BK	12/20-2003	Åbyhøj BK	vs	Randers Cimbria	114:101
Turnovers	(United States) Austin McKellar	13	Hørsholm 79ers	11/30-2002	Randers Cimbria	vs	Hørsholm 79ers	79:83

Stats since 2002.
