= Brian Fitzpatrick (basketball) =

Irish-American basketball player (born 1989)

Personal information
- Born: 6 November 1989 (age 37) Bethpage, New York, U.S.
- Listed height: 6 ft 8 in (2.03 m)
- Listed weight: 235 lb (107 kg)

Career information
- High school: Xavier (Middletown, Connecticut); Northfield Mount Hermon (Northfield, Massachusetts)
- College: Penn (2009–2010); Bucknell (2010–2014)
- NBA draft: 2014: undrafted
- Playing career: 2014–2023
- Position: Power forward

Career history
- 2014: Rethymno Aegean
- 2014: Panionios
- 2015–2016: Horsens IC
- 2016: Levanga Hokkaido
- 2016–2017: Prostějov
- 2018–2019: Borås
- 2019–2020: San Martin Corrientes
- 2021: Haukar
- 2021–2022: BC Odesa
- 2022: Olimpia
- 2022: Bashkimi
- 2022–2023: KR

Career highlights
- Basketligaen Finals MVP (2015); 2× Basketligaen champion (2015, 2016); Danish Cup champion (2015)

Brian Edward Fitzpatrick (born 6 November 1989) is an Irish-American professional basketball player who plays the power forward position. He has represented the Irish National Team and played college basketball at Bucknell University.

== High school career ==
Fitzpatrick played at Xavier High School before doing a post-graduate year at prep power Northfield Mount Hermon.

== College career ==
In October 2008, he committed to the University of Pennsylvania. During his freshman season, head coach Glen Miller was fired and he transferred to Bucknell University. He redshirted for one season and played three more years for the Bison. Fitzpatrick played a limited reserve role in his first two years behind long time NBA veteran Mike Muscala. However he stepped in a bigger role in his final year of eligibility, when he was named to the academic All-Patriot League team in 2014. His 2014 graduating class, headlined by Patriot League Player of the Year, Cameron Ayers, was the winningest class in program history, with a 94–39 record.

== Professional career ==
In August 2014, Fitzpatrick signed a two-year deal with Rethymno Aegean B.C. However, he was released in October and transferred to Panionios also of the Greek Basket League. In January 2015, he signed for the rest of the season with Horsens IC. He helped them win the double and was named Finals MVP.

In September 2015, he resigned with Horsens IC for another season and helped them repeat as champions of the Danish League.

In August 2016, Fitzpatrick signed with Levanga Hokkaido in the first division of the Japanese B.League. Following a calf strain injury, he was released from his contract in early November. On 26 December, he signed with BK Prostějov of the NBL for the rest of the season.

After missing the next season with an ACL tear, he signed with Borås Basket for the 2018–2019 season. He helped Borås Basket to reach the SBL finals, the first in club history.

In July 2019, he signed with San Martin Corrientes of the LNB for the 2019–2020 season.

In January 2021, Fitzpatrick signed with Úrvalsdeild karla club Haukar. In 21 games, he averaged 14.1 points and 10.0 rebounds per game.

In August 2021, Fitzpatrick signed with BC Odesa of the Ukrainian Basketball SuperLeague for the 2021–2022 season. He finished the season with Olimpia of the LUB following the 2022 Russian invasion of Ukraine. His chaotic escape out of Ukraine was chronicled in the Irish Independent.

In August 2022, Fitzpatrick was announced as a new player for Bashkimi of the Superliga and Balkan League for the 2022–2023 season.

In December 2022, Fitzpatrick signed with Úrvalsdeild karla club KR.

== International career ==
In 2016, Fitzpatrick played on Ireland's national team and their national 3x3 team. He participated in the 2016 FIBA Europe 3x3 Championships qualifier in Escaldes-Engordany, Andorra. He also represented Ireland at the 2016 FIBA European Championship for Small Countries in Ciorescu, Moldova, where he was his team's top scorer and the third-best scorer of the tournament.

In November 2021, he was called up for round 1 for the FIBA Eurobasket 2025 Pre-Qualifiers against Cyprus and Austria.
