= Malik Miller =

American basketball player

Personal information
- Born: November 15, 1999 (age 27) Washington, District of Columbia
- Listed height: 6 ft 4 in (1.93 m)

Career information
- College: Morgan State (2018–2023)
- Playing career: 2024–present
- Position: Guard
- Number: 4

Career history
- 2024–2025: Svendborg Rabbits
- 2025–2026: Donar

Career highlights
- Dutch Cup winner (2026)

Malik Miller (born November 15, 1999) is an American professional basketball player who last played for Donar in the BNXT League and ENBL.

== Professional career ==
Malik Miller started his professional career in 2024 with Svendborg Rabbits, playing in the Danish Basketligaen. With the Svendborg Rabbits he reached the final of the Basketligaen, but lost 3-1 to Bakken Bears.

In 2025 he accepted an offer from Donar Groningen, which plays in the BNXT League and in the European competition the ENBL. With Donar he won the Dutch Cup, achieving the first prize of his career.
