= Quentin Peterson =

American basketball player (born 1994)

No. 77 – Pizza Bulls Bordo Bandırma
- Position: Point guard
- League: BSL

Personal information
- Born: October 12, 1994 (age 32)
- Listed height: 6 ft 0 in (1.83 m)
- Listed weight: 185 lb (84 kg)

Career information
- High school: Hedgesville (Hedgesville, West Virginia); Massanutten Military Academy (Woodstock, Virginia)
- College: VMI (2013–2017)
- NBA draft: 2017: undrafted
- Playing career: 2017–present

Career history
- 2017: USK Praha
- 2017–2018: Anyang KGC
- 2018–2019: APOEL
- 2019–2020: Mykolaiv
- 2020–2021: Bakken Bears
- 2021–2022: Gaziantep Basketbol
- 2022–2023: Nanjing Monkey Kings
- 2023–2024: Jilin Northeast Tigers
- 2024: Vaqueros de Bayamón
- 2024–2025: Xinjiang Flying Tigers
- 2025–2026: Illawarra Hawks
- 2026: Fujian Sturgeons
- 2026–present: Bandırma Bordo Basketbol

Career highlights
- Basketligaen champion (2021); Danish Cup winner (2021); Basketligaen MVP (2021); Ukrainian League Top Scorer (2020); 2× First-team All-SoCon (2016, 2017); Second-team All-Big South (2014); Big South All-Freshman Team (2014)

Quentin Level "Q. J." Peterson Jr. (born October 12, 1994) is an American professional basketball player for Pizza Bulls Bordo Bandırma of the Basketbol Süper Ligi (BSL). He played college basketball for the VMI Keydets.

== Early life ==
Peterson attended Hedgesville High School in Hedgesville, West Virginia, where he averaged 21 points, six rebounds and four assists per game as a senior in 2011–12. He played a prep season at Massanutten Military Academy in Woodstock, Virginia in 2012–13.

== College career ==
Peterson signed to play college basketball for the VMI Keydets.

As a freshman in 2013–14, Peterson averaged 19.0 points and 5.6 rebounds per game and was named to the Big South Conference All-Freshman Team and earned second-team All-Big South.

As a sophomore in 2014–15, Peterson scored in double figures in 16 of VMI's first 18 games, including seven games of 20 or more points, but his shooting took a hit. He went 32 for 123 from the field (26 percent), including 10 of 61 (16.4 percent) from 3-point range, in a seven-game span from December 22 to January 14. Following VMI's 75–63 loss at UNCG on January 14, 2015, a contest in which he scored eight points on 2-for-11 shooting with three rebounds in 30 minutes, Peterson suffered a mental breakdown and missed the rest of the season with a medical furlough.

Peterson returned to the team for his junior year in 2015–16 and led the league in scoring (19.6 ppg) and was named first-team All-SoCon.

Peterson declared for the 2016 NBA draft but ultimately returned to VMI. As a senior in 2016–17, he was named first-team All-SoCon by the media and second-team All-SoCon by the coaches. He averaged 19.6 points, 6.5 rebounds, and 2.4 assists per game.

== Professional career ==
On September 7, 2017, Peterson signed his first professional contract with USK Praha of the Czech NBL. After averaging 21.5 points, 7.7 rebounds and 4.3 assists in six games, he signed with Anyang KGC of the Korean Basketball League on November 11, 2017. In 51 games to finish the 2017–18 season, he averaged 15.5 points, 4.1 rebounds, 3.9 assists and 1.2 steals per game.

On October 20, 2018, Peterson was selected by the Lakeland Magic in the first round of the 2018 NBA G League draft. He was waived by the Magic nine days later. On November 16, 2018, he signed with APOEL B.C. of the Cyprus Basketball Division A. He left the team in January 2019 after averaging 15.8 points, 5.3 rebounds, 3.4 assists and 1.4 steals in eight games.

In November 2019, Peterson signed with MBC Mykolaiv of the Ukrainian Basketball Superleague. In 18 games during the 2019–20 season, he averaged 29.5 points, 7.6 rebounds, 6.1 assists and 2.1 steals per game. He was the top scorer of the Ukrainian League.

On June 29, 2020, Peterson signed with the Bakken Bears of the Danish Basketligaen. He was named league MVP for the 2020–21 season after averaging a league-best 22.4 points per game alongside 6.2 rebounds and 4.3 assists. The team won the Basketligaen championship.

On July 9, 2021, Peterson signed with Gaziantep Basketbol of the Turkish Basketbol Süper Ligi. In 32 games during the 2021–22 season, he averaged 18.2 points, 4.3 rebounds, 3.9 assists and 1.3 steals per game.

In July 2022, Peterson signed with the Nanjing Monkey Kings of the Chinese Basketball Association (CBA). In 38 games during the 2022–23 season, he averaged 28.7 points, 7.1 rebounds, 5.9 assists and 2.0 steals per game.

Peterson played for the New York Knicks during the 2023 NBA Summer League. He then returned to China, joining the Jilin Northeast Tigers for the 2023–24 CBA season. In 40 games, he averaged 27.2 points, 6.2 rebounds, 4.7 assists and 1.4 steals per game.

Peterson joined Vaqueros de Bayamón of the Baloncesto Superior Nacional for the 2024 season, averaging 21.8 points, 4.4 rebounds, 4.2 assists and 1.0 steals in 11 games.

For the 2024–25 CBA season, Peterson joined the Xinjiang Flying Tigers. In 37 games, he averaged 20.7 points, 5.1 rebounds and 5.0 assists per game.

On October 30, 2025, Peterson signed with the Illawarra Hawks of the Australian National Basketball League (NBL) for the rest of the 2025–26 season. On December 4, he scored 42 points in a 113–109 overtime win over the South East Melbourne Phoenix. It marked the highest score for a Hawks player since C. J. Bruton had 43 in the 1998–99 season. In 26 games, he averaged 15.3 points, 3.3 rebounds and 3.5 assists per game.

On March 12, 2026, Peterson signed with the Fujian Sturgeons for the rest of the 2025–26 CBA season.

On June 28, 2026, he signed with Bandırma Bordo Basketbol of the Basketbol Süper Ligi (BSL).
