= 2018 Israeli Basketball Premier League Final Four =

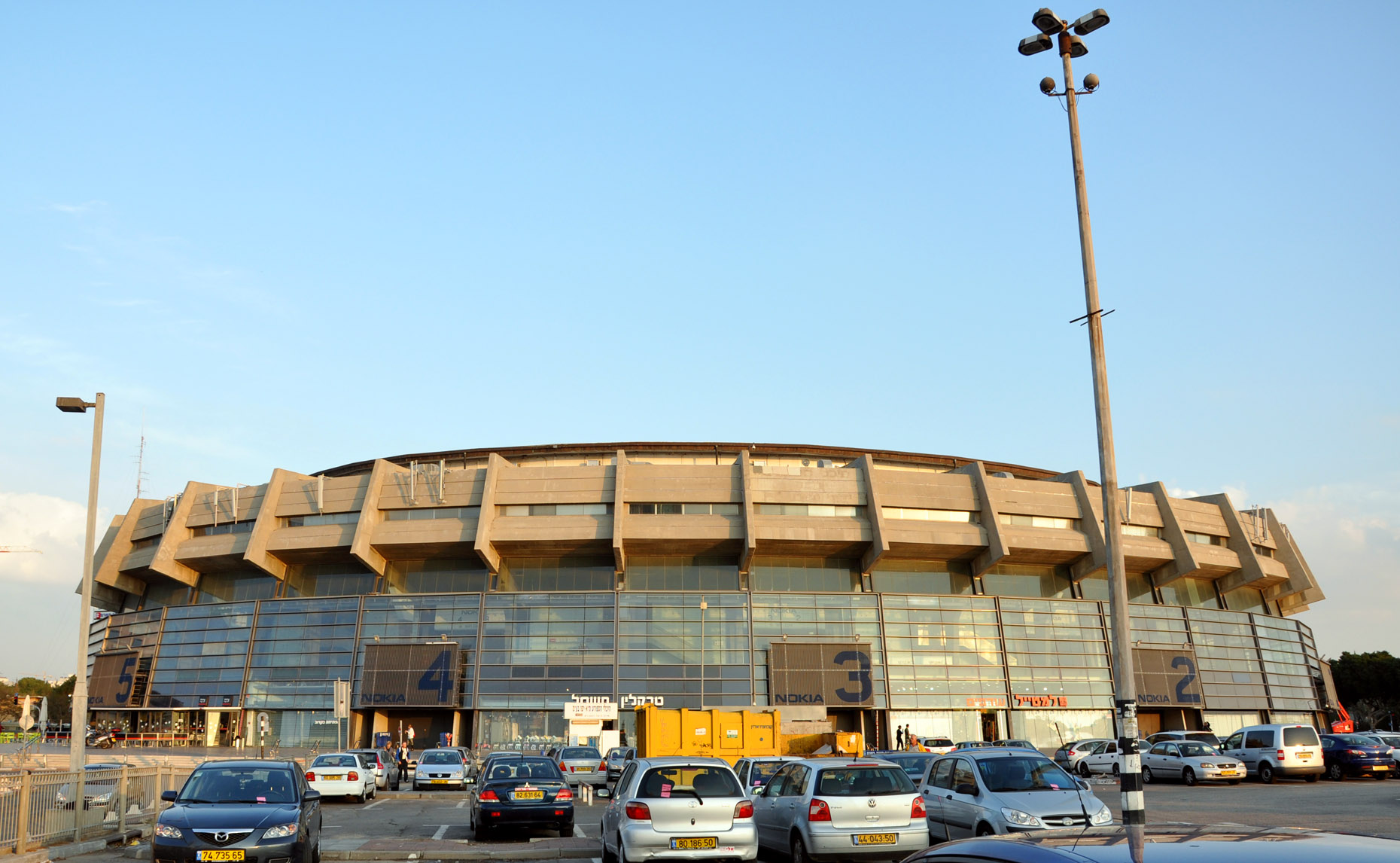
- The Menora Mivtachim Arena hosted the Final Four
- Season: 2017–18 Israeli Premier League

Tournament details
- Arena: Menora Mivtachim Arena; Tel Aviv
- Dates: June 10–14, 2018

Final positions
- Champions: Maccabi Tel Aviv (52nd title)
- Runners-up: Hapoel Holon

Awards and statistics
- MVP: (Israel) Alex Tyus

The 2018 Israeli Basketball Premier League Final Four, for sponsorship reasons the Winner League Final Four, the concluding tournament of the 2017–18 Israeli Basketball Premier League. It was the eight Israeli Final Four. The event was held in the Menora Mivtachim Arena, Tel Aviv from June 10 until June 14, 2018.

Maccabi Tel Aviv won the title for the 52nd time after beating Hapoel Holon 95–75 in the Final. Alex Tyus was named the Final Four MVP.

== Results ==
=== Bracket ===
Semifinals
June 10
Maccabi Tel Aviv	98
Hapoel Tel Aviv	74
June 11
Hapoel Holon	80
Hapoel Jerusalem	76

Final
June 14
Maccabi Tel Aviv	95
Hapoel Holon	75

== Semifinals ==
June 10, 2018	Maccabi Tel Aviv	98–74	Hapoel Tel Aviv	Tel Aviv
21:00	Scoring by quarter: 22–24, 21–16, 24–20, 31–14
Sport 5	Pts: Tyus & Pargo 18; Rebs: Tyus 9 Asts: 6 Players 3 PIR: Tyus 30	Boxscore	Pts: Banks 16; Rebs: Gaffney 6 Asts: 3 Players 3 PIR: Banks 20	Arena: Menora Mivtachim Arena; Attendance: 10,383; Referees: Sefi Shemesh, Gili Cohen, Dan Yalon

Starters:			Pts	Reb	Ast
PG	2	(United States) Jeremy Pargo	18	3	3
G	7	(United States) DeAndre Kane	6	4	0
G/F	5	(United States) Michael Roll	7	3	3
F/C	15	(Israel) Jake Cohen	5	4	3
C	9	(Israel) Alex Tyus	18	9	1
Reserves:					
F	1	(United States) Deshaun Thomas	17	6	3
G	30	(United States) Norris Cole	13	3	3
G	12	(Israel) John DiBartolomeo	12	7	3
G/F	50	(Israel) Yovel Zoosman	2	1	0
F	8	(Israel) Deni Avdija	0	0	1
F	4	(Israel) Karam Mashour	DNP		
F/C	18	(Israel) Itay Segev	DNP		
Head coach:
(Croatia) Neven Spahija

M. Tel Aviv	H. Tel Aviv

Starters:			Pts	Reb	Ast
PG	22	(United States) Jerel McNeal	6	4	3
SG	14	(Israel) Raviv Limonad	10	2	3
SF	8	(Israel) Rafi Menco	9	1	2
PF	3	(United States) Tony Gaffney	10	6	2
C	54	(United States) Matt Howard	5	3	0
Reserves:					
G	1	(Israel) Adrian Banks	16	2	3
PF	41	(Israel) Tomer Ginat	10	5	1
PG	0	(United States) Tywain McKee	8	1	1
F/C	7	(Israel) Daniel Aidan	0	0	0
G	9	(Israel) Dor Wachner	0	0	0
G	10	(Israel) Noam Hason	0	0	0
G	21	(Israel) Shahar Amir	0	0	0
Head coach:
(Israel) Danny Franco

June 11, 2018	Hapoel Holon	80–76	Hapoel Jerusalem	Tel Aviv
21:00	Scoring by quarter: 22–20, 24–21, 20–14, 14–21
Sport 5	Pts: Holloway 24; Rebs: Hamilton 10; Asts: Hamilton 4 PIR: Holloway 27	Boxscore	Pts: Perperoglou 19; Rebs: Howell 12; Asts: Eliyahu 3 PIR: Howell 16	Arena: Menora Mivtachim Arena; Attendance: 10,383; Referees: Omer Esteron, Kfir Mualem, Ofer Manheim

Starters:			Pts	Reb	Ast
G	6	(Israel) Tamir Blatt	3	2	3
G	0	(United States) Tu Holloway	24	1	3
F	25	(United States) Jordan Hamilton	21	10	4
F/C	1	(Israel) T. J. Cline	0	0	0
C	35	(United States) TaShawn Thomas	12	7	1
Reserves:					
F	10	(Israel) Guy Pnini	12	5	2
F/C	11	(Israel) Joe Alexander	3	4	0
G	5	(Israel) Chanan Colman	3	0	1
G	12	(Israel) Shlomi Harush	2	1	0
G	8	(Israel) Harel Dadon	DNP		
F	18	(Israel) Tom Sapir	DNP		
Head coach:
(Israel) Dan Shamir

Holon	Jerusalem

Starters:			Pts	Reb	Ast
PG	11	(Israel) Bar Timor	7	3	2
SG	2	(United States) Jerome Dyson	18	3	2
SF	21	(United States) Tarence Kinsey	9	4	1
F/C	14	(Israel) Richard Howell	8	12	2
C	13	(Dominican Republic) Ronald Roberts	9	4	1
Reserves:					
F	7	(Greece) Stratos Perperoglou	19	3	0
PF	8	(Israel) Lior Eliyahu	6	5	3
PG	12	(Israel) Yogev Ohayon	0	5	2
G	10	(Israel) Yotam Halperin	DNP		
PG	27	(United States) Kalin Lucas	DNP		
C	36	(Israel) Ram Elias-Pour	DNP		
F	44	(Israel) Michael Moshkovitz	DNP		
Head coach:
(Israel) Oded Kattash

== Final ==
June 14, 2018	Maccabi Tel Aviv	95–75	Hapoel Holon	Tel Aviv
21:00	Scoring by quarter: 28–17, 19–14, 21–16, 27–28
Sport 5	Pts: Cohen 18; Rebs: Tyus 15; Asts: Kane 6 PIR: Cohen 26	Boxscore	Pts: Holloway 20; Rebs: Hamilton 9 Asts: Alexander & Colman 3 PIR: Holloway 17	Arena: Menora Mivtachim Arena; Attendance: 10,383; Referees: Amit Balak, David Romano, Elad Leibovich

Starters:			Pts	Reb	Ast
PG	2	(United States) Jeremy Pargo	7	2	4
G	7	(United States) DeAndre Kane	10	10	6
G/F	5	(United States) Michael Roll	15	2	3
F/C	15	(Israel) Jake Cohen	18	6	0
C	9	(Israel) Alex Tyus	10	15	3
Reserves:					
G	30	(United States) Norris Cole	13	5	3
G	12	(Israel) John DiBartolomeo	13	1	0
F	1	(United States) Deshaun Thomas	9	7	0
F/C	18	(Israel) Itay Segev	0	0	0
G/F	50	(Israel) Yovel Zoosman	0	0	0
F	4	(Israel) Karam Mashour	DNP		
Head coach:
(Croatia) Neven Spahija

M. Tel Aviv	Holon

2017–18 Israeli Premier League champions
Maccabi Tel Aviv
52nd title

Starters:			Pts	Reb	Ast
G	6	(Israel) Tamir Blatt	12	2	1
G	0	(United States) Tu Holloway	20	0	1
F	25	(United States) Jordan Hamilton	7	9	1
F	10	(Israel) Guy Pnini	5	2	1
C	35	(United States) TaShawn Thomas	4	5	2
Reserves:					
G/F	41	(United States) Glen Rice Jr.	14	4	2
F/C	11	(Israel) Joe Alexander	13	5	3
G	5	(Israel) Chanan Colman	0	3	3
F/C	1	(Israel) T. J. Cline	0	0	0
G	12	(Israel) Shlomi Harush	0	0	0
G	8	(Israel) Harel Dadon	DNP		
F	18	(Israel) Tom Sapir	DNP		
Head coach:
(Israel) Dan Shamir

== Winning roster ==
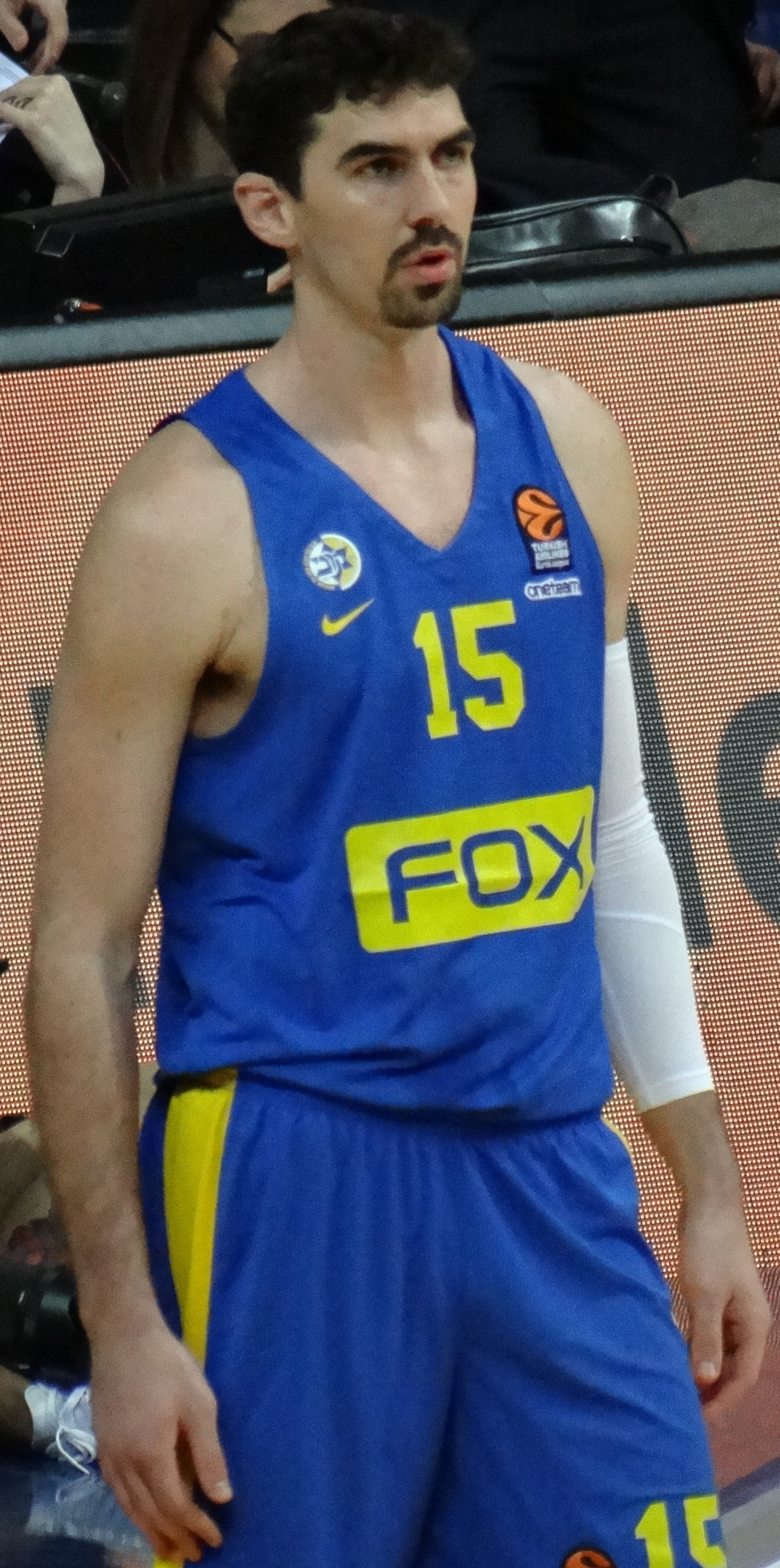
Jake Cohen

2017–18 Maccabi Tel Aviv roster
Players
Coaches

Pos.	No.	Nat.	Name	Ht.
F	1	(United States)	Thomas, Deshaun	2.01 m (6 ft 7 in)
PG	2	(United States)	Pargo, Jeremy	1.88 m (6 ft 2 in)
F	4	(Israel)	Mashour, Karam	1.98 m (6 ft 6 in)
G/F	5	(United States) (Tunisia)	Roll, Michael	1.98 m (6 ft 6 in)
G	7	(United States) (Hungary)	Kane, DeAndre	1.96 m (6 ft 5 in)
G/F	8	(Israel)	Avdija, Deni	2.00 m (6 ft 7 in)
C	9	(United States) (Israel)	Tyus, Alex	2.03 m (6 ft 8 in)
G	12	(United States) (Israel)	DiBartolomeo, John (C)	1.83 m (6 ft 0 in)
F/C	15	(United States) (Israel)	Cohen, Jake	2.10 m (6 ft 11 in)
F/C	18	(Israel)	Segev, Itay	2.04 m (6 ft 8 in)
G	30	(United States)	Cole, Norris	1.88 m (6 ft 2 in)
PF	43	(Australia)	Bolden, Jonah	2.08 m (6 ft 10 in)
C	45	(Belarus)	Parakhouski, Artsiom	2.11 m (6 ft 11 in)
G/F	50	(Israel)	Zoosman, Yovel	2.00 m (6 ft 7 in)
PG	55	(United States)	Jackson, Pierre	1.80 m (5 ft 11 in)

Head coach

- (Croatia) Neven Spahija

Assistant coach(es)

- (Israel) Guy Goodes
- (Israel) Tal Burstein
- (United States) Tim Fanning

Athletic trainer(s)

- (Israel) Regev Fanan

Team manager

- (Croatia) Nikola Vujčić

Legend

- (C) Team captain
- Injured
