= Gladsaxe Basketball Klub =

Danish basketball club

Gladsaxe Basketball Klub or simply Gladsaxe is a Danish basketball club based in Gladsaxe Kommune. The club was founded in 1953 and is among the country's oldest clubs. The club is merged with Efterslægtens Basketballklub and has for some time been called Gladsaxe Efterslægten Basketball Klub.

== History ==
Both Gladsaxe Basketball Club and Efterslægtens Basketballklub, the two original clubs, has a glorious past the men's side, notably posterity who received medals the first 13 seasons, held Denmark championships and took six gold, the last in 1969. Gladsaxe fetched DM -gold in 1964th Efterslægtens Basketballklub dates from after the Efterslægtens Gymnasium and originally belonged together with Efterslægtens Håndboldklub, but when they started merging with Glostrup IC, chose basketball team not to go with. Instead, Glostrup IC in 1974, its own basketball department with the leading forces from Efterslægtens Basketballklub. Instead, it was all for a merger between Gladsaxe and posterity in the Gladsaxe Efterslægten Basketball Club, now called Gladsaxe Basketball Club.

== Titles ==
Danish League

- Winners (7): 1958-59, 1959–60, 1962–63, 1963–64, 1964–65, 1967–68, 1968–69
