= Mike McGuirl =

American basketball player

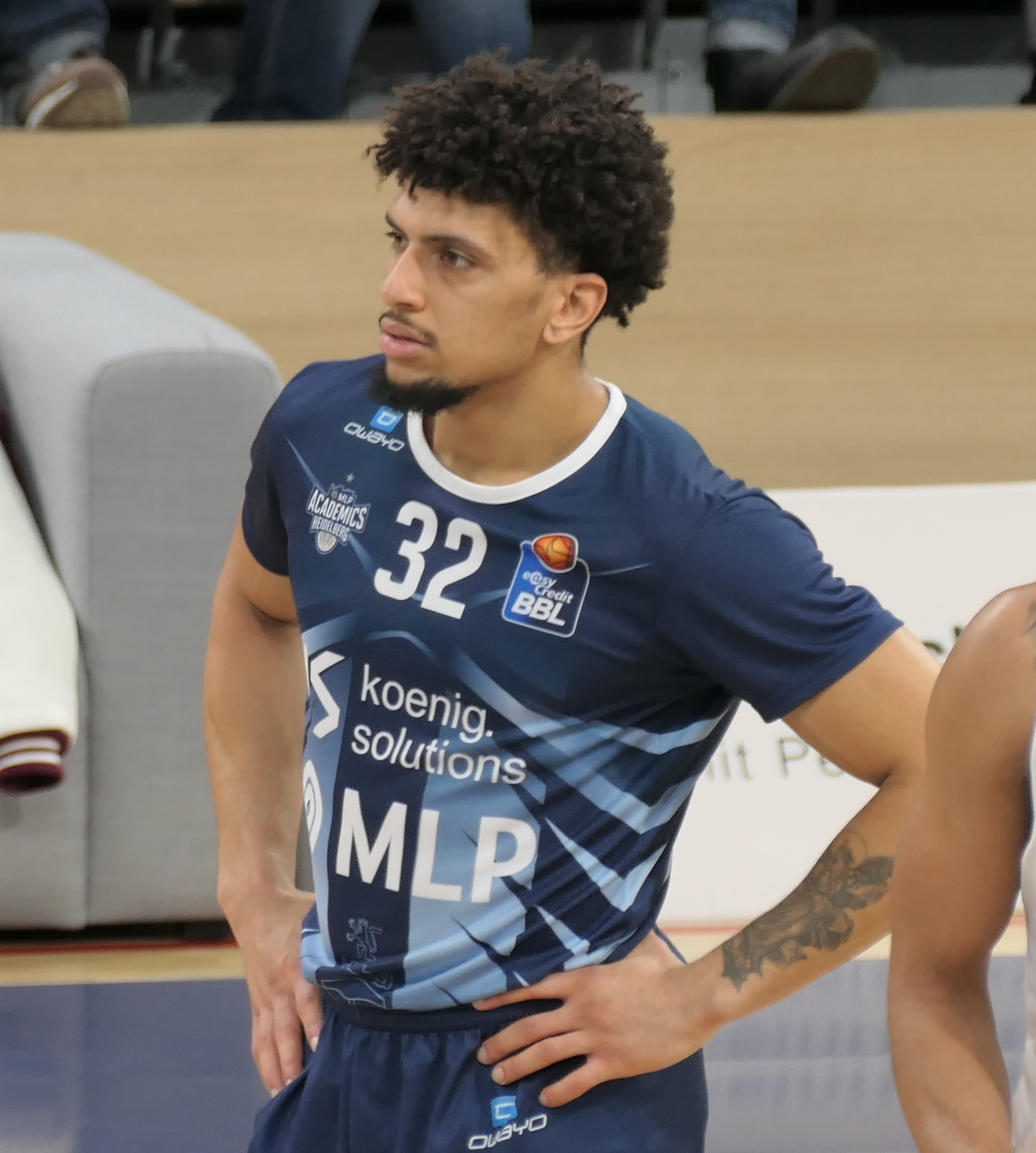
- McGuirl playing for Heidelberg in 2023

No. 11 – Hapoel Haifa
- Position: Point guard
- League: Israeli Basketball Premier League

Personal information
- Born: December 4, 1998 (age 27) Hartford, Connecticut, U.S.
- Listed height: 6 ft 2 in (1.88 m)
- Listed weight: 194 lb (88 kg)

Career information
- High school: East Catholic (Manchester, Connecticut)
- College: Kansas State (2017–2022)
- NBA draft: 2022: undrafted
- Playing career: 2022–present

Career history
- 2022–2023: FOG Næstved
- 2023: MLP Academics Heidelberg
- 2023–present: Hapoel Haifa

Career highlights
- Basketligaen Most Valuable Player (2023); Basketligaen leading scorer (2023)

Mike McGuirl (born December 4, 1998) is an American professional basketball player for Hapoel Haifa of the Israeli Basketball Premier League. McGuirl played five years for Kansas State, from 2017 to 2022.

== Early life and college career ==
Mike McGuirl was born in Hartford, Connecticut, in the United States, and attended East Catholic High School in Manchester, Connecticut.

He played five years for Kansas State (2017–2022).

In March 2018, he expected to redshirt but was pressed into action after sitting out the first 13 games. He scored 17 points in the NCAA Tournament opener against Creighton and averaged over 20 minutes a game during Kansas State's NCAA Elite Eight run.

He was a key contributor to the 2019 Big 12 regular season championship team.

McGuirl was the team's 2020-21 second-leading scorer at 11.8 points per game. He was the only Wildcat to start all 29 games.

In 2021, his teammate Nijel Pack called McGuirl's return for a fifth season “a blessing for all of us.”

Yet, in 2021-22, the Wildcats added a pair of talented transfers in Mark Smith and Markquis Nowell so that McGuirl had been in and out of the starting lineup, averaging 7.4 points and 3.4 rebounds per game.

== Club career ==
In his first season as a professional basketball player, McGuirl averaged 22 points, 4,9 rebounds and 4,1 assists a contest for Team FOG Næstved of Denmark's Basketligaen. He was named 2022-23 Basketligaen Most Valuable Player.

In July 2023, he joined MLP Academics Heidelberg.

In 2023 November he joined Hapoel Haifa in the Israeli Basketball Premier League.

== Player profile ==
McGuirl's college coach Bruce Weber stated that: "The best thing has been his energy, especially on defense." Weber also praised McGuirl's character and work ethic. Weber said "Despite everything going on, he didn’t miss one practice or game."
