= Bears Academy =

Basketball club in Aarhus, Denmark

- Leagues: Basketligaen
- Founded: 2007; 19 years ago
- History: Elite Basketball Akademi Aarhus; 2007–2019; Bears Academy; 2020–present
- Arena: Vejlby-Risskov Hallen
- Capacity: 2,050
- Location: Aarhus, Denmark
- Head coach: Jakob Hjorth
- Affiliation: Bakken Bears
Home	Away

The Bears Academy are a basketball club based in Aarhus, Denmark. Established in 2007, the club is an affiliate of the Bakken Bears. Since 2018, the team plays in the Basketligaen, the highest level of Danish basketball.

== History ==
In 2007, the team was established as Elite Basketball Akademi Aarhus (EBAA). It was founded by Bakken Bears as an affiliate team to provide a link between the talent academy and the professional club.

In the 2018–19 season, EBAA would play in the Basketligaen, the highest tier of Danish basketball. This would make the team the second team from Aarhus in the league, alongside the Bakken Bears.

== Players ==
=== Current roster ===
Bears Academy roster
Players
Coaches

Pos.	No.	Nat.	Name
F	4	(Denmark)	Møllgaard, Magnus
G	5	(Denmark)	Sørensen, Marius
G	6	(Denmark)	Hansen, Mads Bro
G	7	(Denmark)	Vistisen, Jacob
G	8	(Denmark)	Bjerregaard, Malthe
F	9	(Denmark)	Andersen, Mikkel
F	10	(Denmark)	Vinther, Marcus
G	11	(Denmark)	Mønsted, Tobias
G	11	(Denmark)	Harbo, Anton
F	14	(Denmark)	Lilhauge, Daniel
C	15	(United States)	Thomann, Keane
C	16	(Denmark)	Høj Hansen, Mikkel
G	17	(Denmark)	Kirstensen, Anders
G	18	(Denmark)	Svendsen, Mathies
C	19	(Denmark)	Schaarup, Jonas
G	20	(Denmark)	Lauritzen, Sofus
F	21	(Denmark)	Hemmersam, Tobias
G	22	(Denmark)	Ates, Filip

Head coach

(Denmark) Jakob Hjort

Legend

- (C) Team captain
- Injured

- Roster
Updated: 23 September 2021

== Season by season ==
Champions	Runners-up	Playoff berth	Promoted

Season	Tier	League	Finish	Wins	Losses	Win%	Playoffs	Danish Cup	Head coach
EBAA
2018–19	1	Basketligaen	6th	8	14	.364	Lost quarterfinals to Næstved, 0–3	–	Jakob Hjorth
2019–20	1	Basketligaen	8th (Note: The 2019–20 season was cancelled due to the COVID-19 pandemic.)	4	15	.211	—N/a	–	Jakob Hjorth
2020–21	1	Basketligaen	8th	7	15	.318	Lost quarterfinals to Bakken Bears, 0–3	Quarterfinals	Jakob Hjorth
2021–22	1	Basketligaen	6th	14	32	.304	—N/a	1/8 finals	Thomas Hemmingsen
2022–23	1	Basketligaen	9th	16	32	.333	—N/a	Quarterfinals	Thomas Hemmingsen
2023–24	1	Basketligaen	8th	14	34	.292	—N/a	Quarterfinals	Thomas Hemmingsen
2024–25	1	Basketligaen	11th	7	41	.146	—N/a	1/8 finals	Emil Svendsen
