= Morten Thomsen =

Danish equestrian

Personal information
- Nationality: Danish
- Born: 30 September 1957 (age 67); Sønderborg, Denmark

Sport
- Sport: Equestrian

Morten Thomsen (born 30 September 1957) is a Danish equestrian. He competed at the 1988 Summer Olympics and the 2000 Summer Olympics.
