= Monta McGhee =

American basketball player (born 1979)

Personal information
- Born: November 11, 1979 (age 47) Dallas, Texas
- Listed height: 6 ft 6 in (1.98 m)

Career information
- High school: Paul Robeson (Chicago, Illinois)
- College: Kishwaukee College (2000–2002); Lewis (2002–2004)
- NBA draft: 2004: undrafted
- Playing career: 2004–2013
- Position: Small forward
- Number: 5, 11

Career history
- 2004–2005: Team Sjælland Holbæk
- 2005–2007: Horsens IC
- 2007–2008: Cuxhaven BasCats
- 2008–2009: Giants Nördlingen
- 2009–2011: ZZ Leiden
- 2011–2012: Leuven Bears
- 2012–2013: Elitzur Jawne

Monta McGhee (born November 11, 1979) is an American former professional basketball player. McGhee has played for several teams in Europe after his time with the Lewis Flyers in the NCAA2 competition.

== Honours ==
=== Club ===
ZZ Leiden

- Dutch Basketball League (1): 2010–11
- NBB Cup (1): 2009–10

=== Individual ===
ZZ Leiden

- DBL All-Star (1): 2010
