= BMS Herlev =

Professional basketball team in Ballerup, Denmark

- Leagues: Basketligaen
- Founded: 2014; 11 years ago
- History: BMS Herlev Wolfpack; 2014–2021; BMS Herlev; 2021–present
- Arena: Ballerup Super Arena
- Capacity: 6,500
- Location: Ballerup, Denmark (Ballerup and Herlev)
- Head coach: Adrian Moss
- Website: bmsherlev.dk
Home	Away

BMS Herlev, formerly known as Wolfpack, is a professional basketball team based in Ballerup, Denmark. The team was established in 2014, as a result of a merger between the local clubs Falcons, Glostrup IC and BMS Skovlunde. BMS Herlev plays in the Basketligaen, the highest level of national basketball.

== Season by season ==
Season	Tier	League	Pos.	Danish Cup	European competitions
2014–15	1	Basketligaen	5th		
2015–16	2	First Division	2nd		
2016–17	2	First Division	1st		
2017–18	1	Basketligaen	7th	Runner-up	
2018–19	1	Basketligaen	7th	First round	
2019–20	1	Basketligaen	6th	First round	
2020–21	1	Basketligaen	7th		
2021–22	1	Basketligaen	9th	1/8 finals	
2022–23	1	Basketligaen	6th	Quarterfinals	
2023–24	1	Basketligaen	9th	1/8 finals	
2024–25	1	Basketligaen	10th	Quarterfinals	

== Players ==
2020–21 BMS Herlev Wolfpack roster
Players
Coaches

Pos.	No.	Nat.	Name	Ht.	Age
PG	9	(Serbia)	Marsenic, Danijel	1.88 m (6 ft 2 in)	24 – 14 January 2001
G	1	(United States)	Blake, Javion	1.90 m (6 ft 3 in)	27 – 12 July 1998
F	11	(Denmark)	Sylvest, Marc	2.02 m (6 ft 8 in)	25 – 9 June 2000
G	2	(Denmark)	Hertel, Samuel	1.90 m (6 ft 3 in)	25 – 5 August 2000
G		(Denmark)	Viehweg, Joachim	1.86 m (6 ft 1 in)	23 – 28 January 2002
F		(Denmark)	Palsbo, Mikkas	2.02 m (6 ft 8 in)	25 – 29 July 2000
F		(Denmark)	Meyer, Lucas	2.00 m (6 ft 7 in)	25 – 13 April 2000
F		(Denmark)	Pedersen, Patrick	2.00 m (6 ft 7 in)	24 – 21 February 2001
G		(Denmark)	Mortensen, Andreas	1.90 m (6 ft 3 in)	24 – 7 September 2001
C		(Cameroon)	Awana, Bertrand	2.06 m (6 ft 9 in)	25 – 7 September 2000
PF		(United States)	Thomas, Devin	2.03 m (6 ft 8 in)	29 – 4 August 1996
SG		(Denmark)	Kyed Jensen, Johan	1.98 m (6 ft 6 in)	23 – 21 June 2002
F		(Denmark)	Meilby Amundsen, Andreas	2.03 m (6 ft 8 in)	33 – 29 July 1992
C		(Sweden)	Asplund, William	2.05 m (6 ft 9 in)	32 – 17 July 1993
G		(Denmark)	Albek, Max	1.85 m (6 ft 1 in)	26 – 29 June 1999
SG		(Denmark)	Urne, Carlo	1.95 m (6 ft 5 in)	25 – 11 May 2000

Head coach

Pascal Colman

Assistant coach(es)

Adrian Moss

Legend

- (C) Team captain
- Injured

- Roster
Updated: June 2020
