= Danish Men's Basketball Cup =

Danish basketball cup tournament

- Sport: Basketball
- Founded: 1975
- First season: 1975–76
- Country: Denmark
- Continent: FIBA Europe (Europe)
- Most recent champion: Bakken Bears (14th title) (2024–25)
- Most titles: Bakken Bears (14 titles)
- Related competitions: Basketligaen

The Danish Men's Basketball Cup (in Danish: Dansk Pokalturnering for Herrer) is the annual basketball cup competition held in Denmark for professional men's teams. The first season of the competition was played in 1975.

Bakken Bears is the all-time record holder with 14 titles.

== Winners ==
- 1975 Falcon
- 1976 SISU Copenhagen
- 1977 SISU Copenhagen
- 1978 Falcon
- 1979 Falcon
- 1980 Stevnsgade Basketball
- 1981 BBK BMS
- 1982 BBK BMS
- 1983 BBK BMS
- 1984 SISU Copenhagen
- 1985 BBK BMS
- 1986 SISU Copenhagen
- 1987 Stevnsgade Basketball
- 1988 BBK BMS
- 1989 SISU Copenhagen
- 1990 Værløse Basket
- 1991 BBK BMS
- 1992 Horsens IC
- 1993 Stevnsgade Basketball
- 1994 Stevnsgade Basketball
- 1995 Horsens IC
- 1996 SISU Copenhagen
- 1997 SISU Copenhagen
- 1998 SISU Copenhagen
- 1999 Skovbakken Basketball
- 2000 Skovbakken Basketball
- 2001 Værløse Basket
- 2002 BF Copenhagen
- 2003 Skovbakken Basketball
- 2004 SK Århus
- 2005 BK Amager
- 2006 Skovbakken Basketball
- 2007 Svendborg Rabbits
- 2008 Bakken Bears
- 2009 Bakken Bears
- 2010 Bakken Bears
- 2011 Svendborg Rabbits
- 2012 Bakken Bears
- 2013 Svendborg Rabbits
- 2014 Svendborg Rabbits
- 2015 Horsens IC
- 2016 Bakken Bears
- 2017 Team FOG Næstved
- 2018 Bakken Bears
- 2019 Horsens IC
- 2020 Bakken Bears
- 2021 Bakken Bears
- 2022 Svendborg Rabbits
- 2023 Bakken Bears
- 2024 Team FOG Næstved
- 2025 Randers Cimbria

== Finals ==
Season	Champions	Score	Runners-up	MVP	Ref.
2010–11	Bakken Bears	78–75	Svendborg Rabbits		
2011–12	Svendborg Rabbits	75–73	Bakken Bears		
2012–13	Bakken Bears	106–69	Horsholm 79ers	(Denmark) Morten Sahlertz	
2013–14	Svendborg Rabbits	87–84	Bakken Bears	(United States) Johnell Smith	
2014–15	Horsens IC	100–62	Randers Cimbria	(United States) Skyler Bowlin	
2015–16	Bakken Bears	83–66	Horsens IC	(United States) Shawn Glover	
2016–17	Team FOG Næstved	81–80	Horsens IC	(United States) Myles Mack	
2017–18	Bakken Bears	100–67	Copenhagen Wolfpack		
2018–19	Horsens	105–70	Svendborg Rabbits		
2019–20	Bakken Bears	89–80	Horsens		
2020–21	Bakken Bears	82–81 (OT)	Horsens		
2021–22	Svendborg Rabbits	87–85 (OT)	Bakken Bears	Sebastian Åris	
2022–23	Bakken Bears	82–62	Randers Cimbria		
2023–24	Team FOG Næstved	89–86	Bakken Bears		
2024–25	Randers Cimbria	76-75	Bakken Bears		
