= BC Copenhagen =

Professional basketball team in Nørrebro, Copenhagen, Denmark

- Nickname: Supermen
- Leagues: (M) Basketligaen
- Founded: 5 May 1958
- History: Stevnsgade Basket (1958–1999); BK Skjold/Stevnsgade (1999–2004); BK Skjold Basket (2004–2008); Stevnsgade Basketball (2008–2019); Copenhagen Basketball (2019–2021) theView Copenhagen (2021–2022); BC Copenhagen (2022–present)
- Arena: Nørrebrohallen
- Capacity: 600
- Location: Copenhagen, Denmark
- Team colors: Black and White
- Championships: (M) 3 Basketligaen (M) 4 Danish Cup (W) 6 Danish Cup
- Website: BCCopenhagen.com
Home	Away

Basketball Club Copenhagen (mostly known as BC Copenhagen, formerly known as Stevnsgade, Stevnsgade Supermen, Supermen and SBBK) is a Danish professional basketball team located in Nørrebro, Copenhagen. It has been one of the most successful teams in Danish men's basketball history, having won 3 national titles (1979, 1980 and 1995) and 4 domestic cups (1980, 1987, 1993 and 1994). The Stevnsgade women's team has won the Danish Cup 6 times.

== History ==
=== 1958–73: The early years ===
The club was founded at the local school (Stevnsgade Skole) by teachers and students 5 May 1958. Outright it was decided that the club colors should be white and blue. The first official game was against SISU, the reigning Danish Champions, on October 29, 1961, in a Serie 1 game, the second tier 2 in the Danish basketball pyramid, where SISU participated due to lack of teams in the divisions. In the gymnasium of Joachim-Larsen Skolen, the then homecourt, Stevnsgade lost by a wide margin to the Danish champions: 30–75. The club won promotion to 1. Division for the first time following the 1964–65 season. Stevnsgade won its own division in the regular season and defeated the other Serie 1 Champions (Næstved, Svendborg and ASI Aalborg) in the playoffs. However, Stevnsgade was relegated back to Serie 1 the following season. This started a trend for Stevnsgade who would go back and forth between Serie 1 and 1. Division the following years. It was first in the beginning of the 1970s that Stevnsgade finally settled in 1. Division for good.

=== 1973–99: The golden days ===
In the 1970s, 1980s, and 1990s the teams from Copenhagen dominated Danish Basketball. SISU, Falcon, BMS, and Stevnsgade dominated the Danish competitions. Stevnsgade won 26 medals in the league and cup combined. A total of 7 of these were gold as Stevnsgade were crowned Danish champions in 1979, 1980, and 1995 and were cup winners in 1980, 1987, 1993, and 1994. Following the championship in the 1978–79 season Stevnsgade decided to participate in the FIBA European Champions Cup in the 1979–80 season. Stevnsgade faced, amongst others, the German champions Bayer 04 Leverkusen and the European giants from Real Madrid. Real Madrid would go on to win the tournament that year. When Stevnsgade won a back-to-back Danish championship the club decided to once again compete in Europe's elite competition. This time, they faced the great Yugoslav team KK Bosna. However, Stevnsgade could not match these teams and lost all of their European games in both the 1979–80 and 1980–81 season.

In the late 1990s, due to the emergence of Aarhus powerhouse Bakken Bears, the Copenhagen dominance faded and Stevnsgade won fewer titles. Thus, the last set of medals were won in 1997 when the team came in 3rd.

== Arena ==
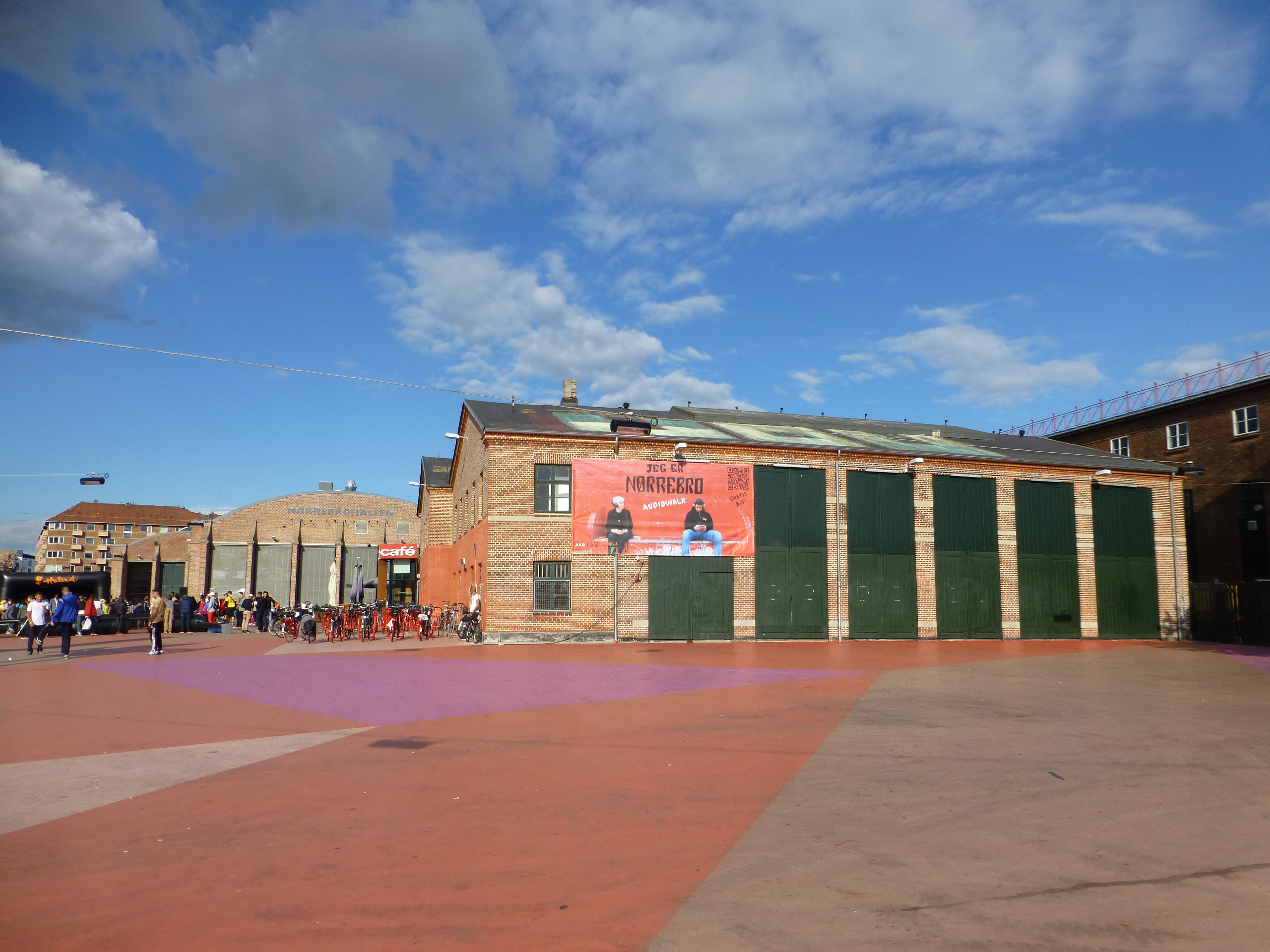
Outside view of Nørrebrohallen.

== Colors and Logos ==
=== Team colors ===
The team originally played in white and blue uniforms when the club was founded in 1958. From 2004 to 2008, when Stevnsgade was a part of BK Skjold, the club played in BK Skjolds colors: Red, white and black. From 2008 the club has been wearing black and white uniforms.

=== Logos ===
Stevnsgade have primarily had round logos but with many different designs. The current one was created after the split from BK Skjold in 2008.

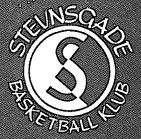
-1990s

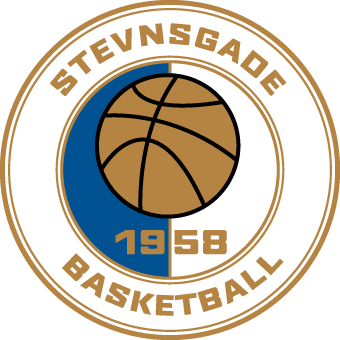
1999–2008

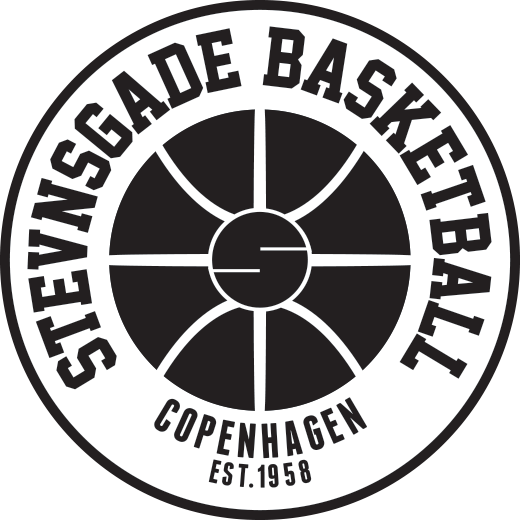
2014–2019

== Men's basketball ==
=== Honours ===
Total titles: 7

==== Domestic ====
Basketligaen

- Winners (3): 1978–79, 1979–80, 1994–95
  - Runners-up (5): 1974–75, 1977–78, 1992–93, 1993–94, 1995–96
  - Third place (9): 1972–73, 1975–76, 1976–77, 1980–1981, 1981–1982, 1986–1987, 1989–1990, 1996–1997, 2000–2001

Danish Cup

- Winners (4): 1979, 1986, 1993, 1994
  - Runners-up (6): 1974, 1982, 1985, 1996, 2000, 2018

==== European ====
Euroleague Basketball

- Winners (0):
- Participants (2): 1979–1980, 1980–1981

=== Season by season ===
Season	Domestic competitions				European competitions		
Season	Tier	League	Pos.	Postseason	Tier	Competition	Result
1962–63	2	Serie 1	6	Not qualified	—N/a		
1963–64	2	Serie 1	2	Not qualified	—N/a		
1964–65	2	Serie 1	1	Champions	—N/a		
1965–66	1	1. Division	7	N/A	—N/a		
1966–67	2	Serie 1	3	Not qualified	—N/a		
1967–68	2	Serie 1	2	Champions	—N/a		
1968–69	1	1. Division	8	N/A	—N/a		
1969–70	1	1. Division	6	N/A	—N/a		
1970–71	1	1. Division	6	N/A	—N/a		
1971–72	1	1. Division	4	N/A	—N/a		
1972–73	1	1. Division	3	N/A	—N/a		
1973–74	1	1. Division	5	N/A	—N/a		
1974–75	1	1. Division	2	N/A	—N/a		
1975–76	1	1. Division	4	Semifinals	—N/a		
1976–77	1	1. Division	3	Semifinals	—N/a		
1977–78	1	1. Division	2	Runners-up	—N/a		
1978–79	1	1. Division	1	Champions	—N/a		
1979–80	1	1. Division	1	Champions	1	FIBA European Champions Cup	RS
1980–81	1	1. Division	3	Semifinals	1	FIBA European Champions Cup	RS
1981–82	1	1. Division	4	Semifinals	—N/a		
1982–83	1	1. Division	5	Not qualified	—N/a		
1983–84	1	1. Division	5	Not qualified	—N/a		
1984–85	1	1. Division	8	Not qualified	—N/a		
1985–86	1	1. Division	Unk.	Unk.	—N/a		
1986–87	1	1. Division	Unk.	Semifinals	—N/a		
1987–88	1	1. Division	Unk.	Unk.	—N/a		
1988–89	1	1. Division	Unk.	Unk.	—N/a		
1989–90	1	1. Division	Unk.	Semifinals	—N/a		
1990–91	1	1. Division	Unk.	Unk.	—N/a		
1991–92	1	1. Division	Unk.	Unk.	—N/a		
1992–93	1	1. Division	Unk.	Runners-up	—N/a		
1993–94	1	1. Division	Unk.	Runners-up	—N/a		
1994–95	1	1. Division	1	Champions	—N/a		
1995–96	1	Basketligaen	2	Runners-up	—N/a		
1996–97	1	Basketligaen	Unk.	Semifinals	—N/a		
1997–98	1	Basketligaen	Unk.	Unk.	—N/a		
1998–99	1	Basketligaen	Unk.	Unk.	—N/a		
1999–00	1	Basketligaen	Unk.	Unk.	—N/a		
2000–01	1	Basketligaen	Unk.	Semifinals	—N/a		
2001–02	1	Basketligaen	Unk.	Unk.	—N/a		
2002–03	1	Basketligaen	5	Unk.	—N/a		
2003–04	1	Basketligaen	9	Relegated	—N/a		
2004–05	2	1. Division	Unk.	Unk.	—N/a		
2005–06	2	1. Division	Unk.	Unk.	—N/a		
2006–07	2	1. Division	Unk.	Unk.	—N/a		
2007–08	2	1. Division	4	Unk.	—N/a		
2008–09	2	1. Division	1	Semifinals	—N/a		
2009–10	2	1. Division	1	Champions	—N/a		
2010–11	2	1. Division	5	Quarterfinals	—N/a		
2011–12	2	1. Division	6	Quarterfinals	—N/a		
2012–13	2	1. Division	3	Champions	—N/a		
2013–14	2	1. Division	2	Champions	—N/a		
2014–15	2	1. Division	1	Champions	—N/a		
2015–16	1	Basketligaen	7	Quarter-finals	—N/a		

=== Notable players ===
Criteria

To appear in this section a player must have either:

- Played at least three seasons for the club.
- Set a club record or won an individual award while at the club.
- Played at least one official international match for their national team at any time.
- Played at least one official WNBA match at any time.

- (Denmark) Mathias Christensen
- (Denmark) Bakary Dibba
- (United States) Durell Vinson

== Women's basketball ==
=== Honours ===
==== Domestic ====
Dameligaen

- Runners-up (7): 1983–84, 1984–85, 2001–02, 2013–14, 2015–16, 2017–18, 2018–19
  - Third place (2): 1991–92, 1993–94

Danish Cup

- Winners (6): 1989, 1991, 1992, 2002, 2015, 2016
  - Runners-up (3): 1984, 1993, 2019

=== Notable players ===
Criteria

To appear in this section a player must have either:

- Played at least three seasons for the club.
- Set a club record or won an individual award while at the club.
- Played at least one official international match for their national team at any time.
- Played at least one official WNBA match at any time.

- (Iceland) Hanna Björg Kjartansdóttir
