= Horsens IC =

Professional basketball team in Horsens, Denmark

- Nickname: HIC
- Leagues: Basketligaen
- Founded: 1978; 48 years ago
- Arena: Forum Horsens
- Capacity: 4,000
- Location: Horsens, Denmark
- Team colors: Yellow, Red
- Head coach: Vedran Borovčanin
- Championships: 6 Danish Championships; 4 Danish Cups
- Website: www.hicbasket.dk
Home	Away

Horsens Idræts Club Basketball, commonly known as Horsens IC or Horsens, is a professional basketball team based in Horsens, Denmark. The club plays at the Forum Horsens, which can accommodate 4,000 people.

The team holds six titles in the Basketligaen, Denmark's top basketball league.

== Honours ==
- Basketligaen
  - Winners (6): 1991–92, 1993–94, 1997–98, 2005–06, 2014–15, 2015–16
- Danish Cup
  - Winners (4): 1992, 1995, 2015, 2019

== Players ==
=== Current roster ===
Note: Flags indicate national team eligibility at FIBA-sanctioned events. Players may hold other non-FIBA nationalities not displayed.

Horsens IC roster
Players
Coaches

Pos.	No.	Nat.	Name
SG	0	(United States)	Marek Nelson
F	1	(Denmark)	Liam Sorensen
SG	2	(United States)	Matt Balanc
SG	5	(United States)	Trejon Jacob
F	6	(Denmark)	Frederik Rungby
PG	7	(Australia)	Sejr Deans
PG	9	(Denmark)	Marius Kirkholt
PF	10	(Denmark)	Mads Daugaard
F	11	(Denmark)	Mikkel Brochner
C	34	(United States)	Hall Elisias
SF	35	(Denmark)	Elias Norgaard

Head coach

(Bosnia and Herzegovina) Vedran Borovčanin

Assistant coach(es)

(Denmark) Ignacio Munoc

(Denmark) Igor Djukelic

Legend

- (C) Team captain
- Injured

- Roster
Updated: 29 October 2024

=== Notables ===
==== Players ====
Note: Flags indicate national team eligibility at FIBA-sanctioned events. Players may hold other non-FIBA nationalities not displayed.

Criteria

To appear in this section a player must have either:

- Set a club record or won an individual award while at the club
- Played at least one official international match for their national team at any time
- Played at least one official NBA match at any time.

- (Denmark) Lasse Elbaek
- (Denmark) Kevin Larsen
- (Denmark) Gabriel Lundberg
- (Denmark) Frederik Rungby
- (Denmark) Bakir Serdarevic
- (Republic of Ireland) Brian Fitzpatrick
- (Iceland) Egill Jónasson
- (Uganda) Deng Geu
- (United States) Skyler Bowlin
- (United States) Charles Callison
- (United States) David Efianayi
- (United States) Myles Mack

==== Coaches ====
To appear in this section a coach must have either:

– Set a club record or won an individual award as a professional coach.
– Coached at least one official international match for a senior national team at any time.

- (Croatia) Arnel Dedic
- (Iceland) Finnur Freyr Stefánsson

== Season by season ==
Season	Tier	League	Pos.	Danish Cup	European competitions
2014–15	1	Basketligaen	1st	Champion	
2015–16	1	Basketligaen	1st	Runner-up	
2016–17	1	Basketligaen	2nd	Runner-up	
2017–18	1	Basketligaen	2nd	Semifinalist	
2018–19	1	Basketligaen	2nd	Champion	
2019–20	1	Basketligaen	3rd	Runner-up	
2020–21	1	Basketligaen	2nd	Runner-up	
2021–22	1	Basketligaen	3rd	Quarterfinalist	
2022–23	1	Basketligaen	4th	Quarterfinalist	
2023–24	1	Basketligaen	3rd	Fourth place	
2024–25	1	Basketligaen	4th	Semifinalist	
