= Randers Cimbria =

Professional basketball team in Randers, Denmark

- Leagues: Basketligaen
- Founded: 1965; 61 years ago
- Arena: Arena Randers
- Capacity: 500 or 3,000
- Location: Randers, Denmark
- President: Morten Hansen
- Team manager: Mike Nielsen
- Head coach: Jeffrey Fawme
- Championships: 2 Danish Cups
- Website: www.randerscimbria.dk
Home	Away

Randers Cimbria is a Danish basketball team based in Randers. The best performance of the team in the league were 2014 and 2020, when they finished second in the Basketligaen. However, in the 2024-2025 season, led by coach Jeffrey Fawme, Randers Cimbria brought home their first gold medal in club history, winning the cup final in a close game 76-75 against Bakken Bears. Finishing 3rd in the league that same season accounts of the best season in the history of the club.

== History ==
Randers was founded in 1965, but after winning the bronze medal in 2008-09 they were declared bankrupt, and were relegated to the 2. division. In 2011-12 they were again promoted to the best liga in Denmark, and have been there since.

== Honours ==
Basketligaen

- Runners-up (2): 2013–14, 2019–20
- Bronze (2): 2008-09, 2017–18

Danish Cup

- Winners (2): 2025, 2026

== Players ==
=== Current roster ===
Randers Cimbria roster
Players
Coaches

Pos.	No.	Nat.	Name	Ht.
PG	1	(Denmark)	Sharif Barfi
F	3	(United States)	Nathan Scott
G	7	(Denmark)	Viktor Lorenzen
G	8	(Denmark)	Anton Lønstrup Hansen
F	11	(Denmark)	Casper Stage Jørgensen
F	12	(Denmark)	Morten Bulow
G	15	(United States)	Bakary Camara
F	22	(Denmark)	Oscar Alm
F	23	(United States)	Brandon Norfleet
F	25	(Denmark)	Oliver Barker
C	28	(Denmark)	Simon Jensen
F/C	31	(United States)	Mikel Beyers
G	45	(United States)	Josh Fortune

Head coach

(Denmark) Jeffrey Fawme

Assistant coach(es)

[[]]

Legend

- (C) Team captain
- Injured

- Roster
Updated: 03 January 2023

Note: Flags indicate national team eligibility at FIBA-sanctioned events. Players may hold other non-FIBA nationalities not displayed.

=== Individual awards ===
Basketligaen MVP

- (United States) Bonell Colas – 2009

Basketligaen Best Defender

- (United States) Bonell Colas – 2012/13

Basketligaen Best Coach

- (United States) Mark Collins – 2008/9
- (United States) Jimmy Moore – 2019/20

== Season by season ==
Season	Tier	League	Pos.	Danish Cup	European competitions
2014–15	1	Basketligaen	6th	Semifinalist	
2015–16	1	Basketligaen	6th	Semifinalist	
2016–17	1	Basketligaen	7th	Quarterfinalist	
2017–18	1	Basketligaen	3rd	Quarterfinalist	
2018–19	1	Basketligaen	4th	Quarterfinalist	
2019–20 (Note: The 2019–20 season was finished prematurely because of the COVID-19 pandemic. Based on the standings at the time, Randers was runner-up.)	1	Basketligaen	2nd	Semifinalist	
2020–21	1	Basketligaen	4th	Semifinalist	
2021–22	1	Basketligaen	4th	Semifinalist	
2022–23	1	Basketligaen	3rd	Runner-up	
2023–24	1	Basketligaen	5th	Third place	
2024–25	1	Basketligaen	3rd	Champions	
