= BK Amager =

Professional basketball team in Kastrup, Denmark

- Nickname: BKA
- League: Basketligaen
- Founded: 1976
- Arena: Amagerhallen
- Capacity: 1,500
- Location: Kastrup, Amager, Denmark
- Website: bkamager.dk
Home

BK Amager is a Danish basketball club based in the Kastrup suburb on Amager. Established in 1976, the team plays in the Basketligaen.

The club was founded in 1976 as Amager Basket, by two school teachers Benny Nielsen and Flemming Holm Jensen. In 2019, Amager joined the Basketligaen again after an absence of nine years.
