= Arena Randers =

Sports facility complex in Denmark

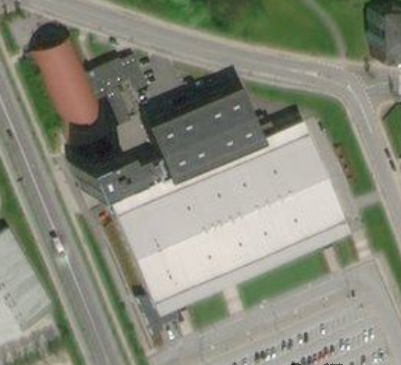
- Interactive map of Arena Randers
- Full name: Arena Randers
- Former names: Randershallen; Elro Arena; Skyline Arena
- Location: Fyensgade 1; 8900 Randers C
- Coordinates: 56°27′52.13″N 10°0′50.38″E
- Owner: Randers Sports centers
- Capacity: 3.000 (Sports events); 3.500 (Concerts)

Construction
- Built: 1952/1972
- Cost: 7 million DKK

Tenants
- Randers HK; Randers HH; Randers Cimbria

Arena Randers is a complex of sports facilities, located in Randers, Denmark.

The hall's history goes back to 1952, when Randers Freja constructed Annex Hall. The ground was provided by Randers Municipality, which in 1962 took over the hall. It was also the municipality that paid for the construction of the Randershallen, which was completed in 1972 and cost 9 million kroner to construct. The hall has over the years laid floor for everything from boxing handball matches to consumer fairs. The third hall, simply called Hall 3, was inaugurated in 2007. Today the hall is run by the private institution Randers Sports centers, which also owns other halls in the city.

The energy Company Elro bought in 2006 a name sponsorship, and the hall was therefore called Elro Arena until 2011. From 2011 the hall has gone under the name Skyline Arena.

== Sources and external references ==
- Arena Randers' homesite (Danish)
- Randershallen that was to Elro Arena Randers Amtsavis December 23, 2010 (Danish)
