= Team FOG Næstved =

Professional basketball team in Næstved, Denmark

- Leagues: Basketligaen
- Founded: 1962; 64 years ago
- Arena: Arena Næstved
- Capacity: 3,500
- Location: Næstved, Denmark
- Team colors: Black, White
- Head coach: Danny Peters
- Championships: 2 Danish Cup
- Website: teamfog.dk
Home	Away

Team FOG Næstved is a professional basketball team from Næstved, Denmark, playing in the best Danish basketball league, Basketligaen. The team won its first title in 2017, where they won the Danish Basketball Cup. Their current head coach is Andy Hipsher. The team is named after the former supermarket chain FOG.

In the 2015–16 Basketligaen season, the club had the highest average attendances in the league's regular season, as the club finishing third. In the 2016–17 season, FOG once again had the highest average attendance in the league's regular season with an average of 1,168 attendants per game.

== Current roster ==
Note: Flags indicate national team eligibility at FIBA-sanctioned events. Players may hold other non-FIBA nationalities not displayed.

FOG Næstved roster
Players
Coaches

Pos.	No.	Nat.	Name
F	0	(United States)	Holden Redparth
G	2	(Denmark)	Khaled Pedersen
G	4	(United States)	Jagan Mosely
G	5	(United States)	Greg Elliott
G	7	(Haiti)	David Jean-Baptiste
F	10	(United States)	Zay Williams
F	12	(United States)	Max Rice
C	13	(United States)	Simeus Webster
G	15	(Denmark)	Lukas Christensen
C	22	(Netherlands)	Wietze Nossek
C	33	(Denmark)	Anders Beier-Christiansen
G	44	(United States)	Caleb Huffman

Head coach

(United States) Danny Peters

Assistant coach(es)

(United States) Brendan Jones

Legend

- (C) Team captain
- Injured

- Roster
Updated: 31 July 2026

== Notable players ==
Note: Flags indicate national team eligibility at FIBA-sanctioned events. Players may hold other non-FIBA nationalities not displayed.

Criteria

To appear in this section a player must have either:

- Set a club record or won an individual award while at the club
- Played at least one official international match for their national team at any time
- Played at least one official NBA match at any time.

- (Denmark) Mathias Christensen
- (Denmark) Zarko Jukic
- (Denmark) Martin Poulsen
- (Israel) Anton Shoutvin
- (South Africa) Christopher Gabriel
- (United States) Corin Henry
- (United States) Mike McGuirl
- (United States) Lee Roberts

== Head coaches ==
- (United States) Chris Gillet: (2018-19)
- (United States) Daniel Pearson: (2023-24)
- (United States) David Pavlakovich: (2024–present)

== Honours ==
Basketligaen

- Runner-up (2): 2022–23, 2023–24
- Third place (4): 2010–11, 2014–15, 2015–16, 2018–19

Danish Men's Basketball Cup

- Winners (2): 2016-17, 2023–24

== Season by season ==
Former logo of the team, used until 2017

Season	Tier	League	Pos.	Danish Cup	European competitions
2014–15	1	Basketligaen	3rd	Quarterfinalist	
2015–16	1	Basketligaen	3rd	Quarterfinalist	
2016–17	1	Basketligaen	5th	Champion	
2017–18	1	Basketligaen	4th	Round of 16	
2018–19	1	Basketligaen	3rd	Semifinalist	
2019–20	1	Basketligaen	4th (Note: The 2019–20 season was curtailed due to the COVID-19 pandemic.)	Semifinalist	
2020–21	1	Basketligaen	5th	Semifinalist	
2021–22	1	Basketligaen	5th	Semifinalist	
2022–23	1	Basketligaen	2nd	Semifinalist	
2023–24	1	Basketligaen	2nd	Champion	
2024–25	1	Basketligaen	5th	Semifinalist	
