= Svendborg Rabbits =

Professional basketball team in Svendborg, Denmark

- Nickname: Kaninerne (The Rabbits)
- League: Basketligaen
- Founded: 1958; 68 years ago
- History: Svendborg Basketball Club; 1958–2006; Svendborg Rabbits; 2006–present
- Arena: Rise Sparekasse Arena / Svendborg Idrætscenter
- Capacity: 1,922
- Location: Svendborg, Denmark
- Team colors
- President: Poul Lindholm Christiansen
- Team manager: Troels Fjellø Mortensen
- Head coach: Mads Andersen
- Championships: 1 Danish Championship; 4 Danish Cups
- Website: www.rabbits.dk
Home	Away

Svendborg Rabbits is a Danish professional basketball team from Svendborg. The club currently plays in the Basketligaen, the top division of basketball in Denmark. The home ground of the club is Svendborg Idrætscenter, nicknamed the Kaninhulen (The Rabbit Hole).

The team won gold in the best Danish basketball league in the 2009–10 season, silver in the 2006–07, 2007–08, 2008–09, 2010/11, 2011/12 and 2012/13 seasons. They won gold in the Danish Cup tournament in 2007, 2011, 2013 and 2022. They competed in the 2008–09 FIBA EuroChallenge and have entered into the European North Basketball League in the 2023-24 season.

== Players ==
=== Current roster ===
Note: Flags indicate national team eligibility at FIBA-sanctioned events. Players may hold other non-FIBA nationalities not displayed.

2023/24 Svendborg Rabbits roster
Players
Coaches

Pos.	No.	Nat.	Name	Ht.	Wt.	Age
F	0	(United States)	Isaiah Small
G	1	(Denmark)	Tyrese Dada	1.97 m (6 ft 6 in)	90 kg (198 lb)	21 – 11 March 2005
PG	2	(Denmark)	Valdemar Frilund
G	3	(United States)	Jemarl Baker Jr	1.95 m (6 ft 5 in)
F	4	(Denmark)	Kalle Dyrhauge	1.99 m (6 ft 6 in)	82 kg (181 lb)	21 – 23 March 2005
F	5	(Denmark)	Parker Bjorklund
F	8	(Denmark)	Gabriel Vogel	1.99 m (6 ft 6 in)	88 kg (194 lb)	20 – 18 May 2005
C	11	(Denmark)	Jacob Jensen (C)	2.15 m (7 ft 1 in)	132 kg (291 lb)	32 – 15 February 1994
G	11	(United States)	Malik Miller
G	12	(Denmark)	Magnus Sorensen
G	13	(Denmark)	Anton Harbo	1.91 m (6 ft 3 in)	87 kg (192 lb)	26 – 10 March 2000
G	17	(Denmark)	Sofus Hultén	1.88 m (6 ft 2 in)	85 kg (187 lb)	22 – 31 August 2003
PG	18	(Denmark)	Balsa Veljic
PF/C	23	(Denmark)	Olamide Pedersen
G	49	(Denmark)	William Jelle

Head coach

- (Denmark) Mads Andersen

Assistant coach(es)

- (Germany) Tom Walther

Legend

- (C) Team captain
- Injured

- Roster
Updated: 11 November 2024

== Notable players ==
To appear in this section a player must have either:

- Set a club record or won an individual award as a professional player.
- Played at least one official international match for his senior national team at any time.

- (Denmark) Tomas Bjarkason
- (Denmark) Leonardo Carlino
- (Denmark) Adama Darboe
