= Basketligaen Defender of the Year =

The Basketligaen Defender of the Year is an annual basketball award that is given by the Danish top tier Basketligaen. It is awarded to the best defensive player in a given regular season. The award was introduced in the 2010–11 season. Michel Diouf holds the record for most awards won.

== Winners ==
| ^ | Denotes player who is still active in the Basketligaen |
| * | Inducted into the FIBA Hall of Fame |
| Player (X) | Denotes the number of times the player has received the award |

| Season | Player | Position | Nationality | Team | Ref. |
|---|---|---|---|---|---|
| 2010–11 | Nicolai Iversen | Forward | Denmark | Svendborg Rabbits | |
| 2011–12 | Corin Henry | Guard | United States | Team FOG Næstved | |
| 2012–13 | Bonell Colas | Forward | United States | Randers Cimbria | |
| 2013–14 | Frederik Hougaard Nielsen | Guard | Denmark | Hørsholm 79ers | |
| 2014–15 | Baye Keita | Center | Senegal | Horsens IC | |
| 2015–16 | Michel Diouf | Center | Senegal | Bakken Bears | |
| 2016–17 | Jyles Smith | Forward | United States | Hørsholm 79ers | |
| 2017–18 | Michel Diouf (2) | Center | Senegal | Bakken Bears | |
| 2018–19 | Michel Diouf (3) | Center | Senegal | Bakken Bears | |
| 2019–20 | Michel Diouf (4) | Center | Senegal | Bakken Bears | |
| 2020–21 | Tylor Ongwae | Forward | Kenya | Bakken Bears | |
| 2021–22 | Tylor Ongwae (2) | Forward | Kenya | Bakken Bears | |
| 2022–23 | Bakary Camara | Small forward | United States | Randers Cimbria | |
| 2023–24 | Kur Jongkuch | Forward | South Sudan | Horsens IC | |
| 2024–25 | Olamide Pedersen | Forward | Denmark | Svendborg Rabbits | |
