= Basketligaen Finals MVP =

Annual basketball award

The Basketligaen Finals Most Valuable Player (Danish: Basketligaen MVP i Finaleserien) is an annual basketball award that is given by the Danish top tier Basketligaen. It is awarded to the player who was considered to be the best in a finals series of a Basketligaen season.

== Winners ==
^	Denotes player who is still active in the Basketligaen
*	Inducted into the FIBA Hall of Fame
Player (X)	Denotes the number of times the player has received the award

Year	Player	Position	Nationality	Team	Ref.
2013	Chris Christoffersen	Center	Denmark	Bakken Bears	
2014	Kenny Barker	Guard	United States	Bakken Bears	
2015	Brian Fitzpatrick	Forward/center	Ireland (Note: Brian Fitzpatrick, born in Bethpage, New York, also owns the American nationality.)	Horsens IC	
2016	Nimrod Hilliard IV	Guard	United States	Horsens IC	
2017	DeVaughn Akoon-Purcell	Forward	Trinidad and Tobago (Note: DeVaughn Akoon-Purcell, born in Orlando, Florida, also owns the American nationality.)	Bakken Bears	
2018	Jeffrey Crockett	Forward	United States	Bakken Bears	
2019	Tobin Carberry	Guard	United States	Bakken Bears	
2021	Michel Diouf	Center	Senegal	Bakken Bears	
2022	Marvelle Harris	Guard	United States	Bakken Bears	
2023	Ryan Evans	Forward	United States	Bakken Bears	
2024	Gustav Knudsen	Guard	Denmark	Bakken Bears	
2025	Urald King	Forward	United States	Bakken Bears	
