= Michel Diouf =

Senegalese basketball player (born 1989)

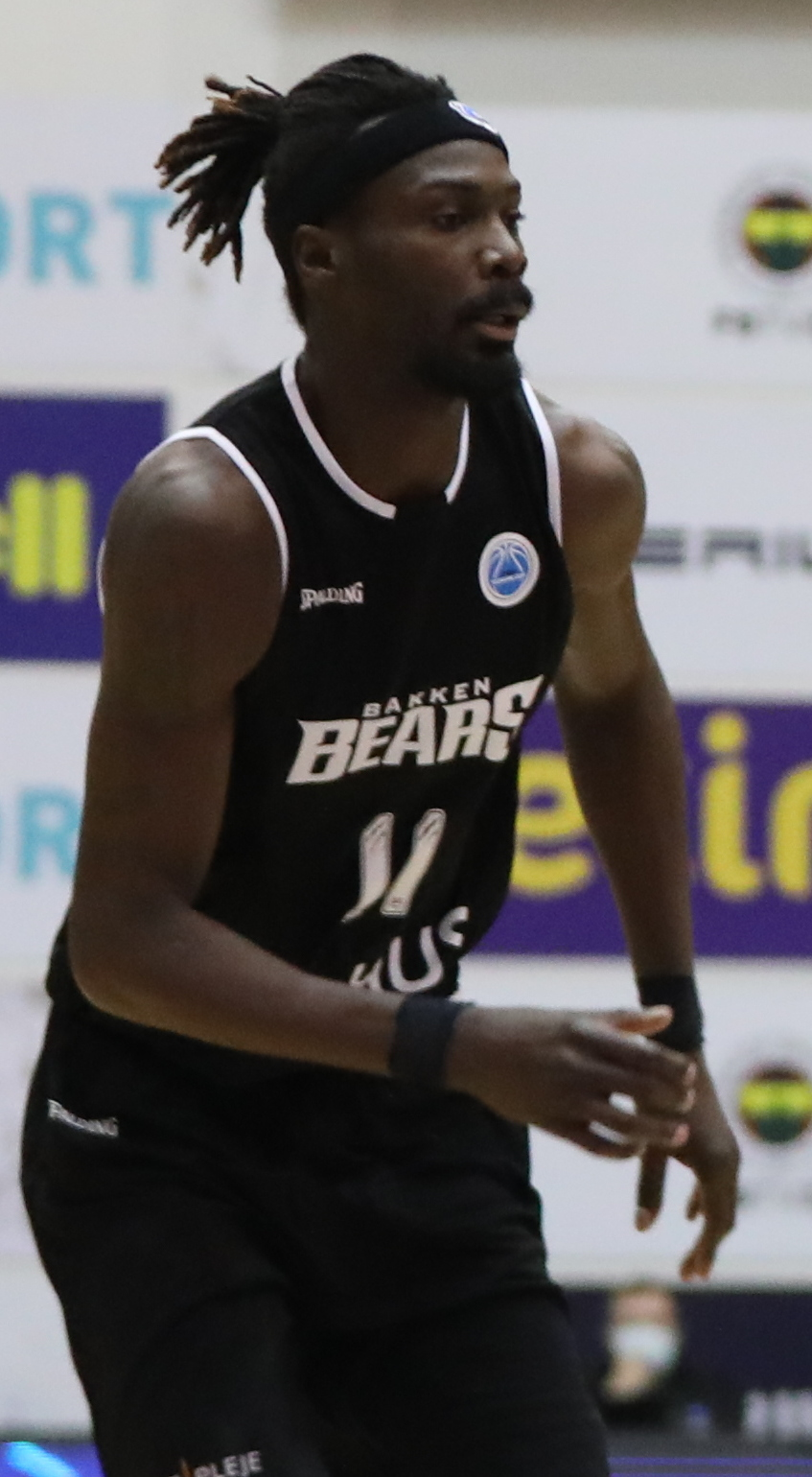
- Diouf with Bakken Bears in 2021

No. 11 – Ciudad de Huelva Baloncesto
- Position: Center

Personal information
- Born: 19 April 1989 (age 37) Medina Gounass, Senegal
- Listed height: 2.08 m (6 ft 10 in)
- Listed weight: 102 kg (225 lb)

Career information
- NBA draft: 2011: undrafted
- Playing career: 2007–present

Career history
- 2007–2009: CB Qalat
- 2009–2011: CB Tarragona
- 2011–2012: Palencia
- 2012: Fuenlabrada
- 2012–2014: Breogán
- 2014–2015: Miraflores Burgos
- 2015–2024: Bakken Bears
- 2024: Nairobi City Thunder
- 2025–present: Ciudad de Huelva Baloncesto

Career highlights
- FIBA Europe Cup all-time leading scorer; FIBA Europe Cup all-time rebounding leader; FIBA Europe Cup all-time blocks leader; 8× Basketligaen champion (2017–2024); Basketligaen Finals MVP (2021); 4× Basketligaen Defender of the Year (2016, 2018–2020); 5× Danish Cup champion (2016, 2018, 2020, 2021, 2023). *ENBL champion ( 2024)

Michel Diogoye Diouf (born 19 April 1989) is a Senegalese professional basketball player. Diouf is a four-time winner of the Basketligaen Defender of the Year award. He is the current second all-time leader in points, rebounds and blocks in the FIBA Europe Cup.

== Career ==
In the 2020–21 season, Diouf won his fifth Basketligaen championship with Bakken Bears and was named the Finals MVP. On 21 March 2022, Diouf became the all-time leading scorer of the FIBA Europe Cup in a quarterfinal game against Oradea. He surpassed Trae Golden's record of 789 total points. Diouf left Bakken after a nine-year stint in 2024.

On 19 September 2024, Diouf joined the Nairobi City Thunder of the Kenyan KBF Premier League and the Road to BAL. In February 2025, he inked a deal with Spanish third-division side Ciudad de Huelva Baloncesto.

== Honours ==
=== Club ===
Bakken Bears

- 8× Basketligaen: (2017, 2018, 2019, 2020, 2021, 2022, 2023 ,2024)

=== Individual ===
- 4× Basketligaen Defender of the Year: (2016, 2018, 2019, 2020)
- Basketligaen Finals MVP: (2021)
