= DeVaughn Akoon-Purcell =

Trinidad and Tobago-American basketball player

No. 3 – Jilin Northeast Tigers
- Position: Shooting guard
- League: CBA

Personal information
- Born: June 5, 1993 (age 33) Orlando, Florida, U.S.
- Listed height: 6 ft 5 in (1.96 m)
- Listed weight: 200 lb (91 kg)

Career information
- High school: West Oaks Academy (Orlando, Florida)
- College: Eastern Oklahoma State (2012–2014); Illinois State (2014–2016)
- NBA draft: 2016: undrafted
- Playing career: 2016–present

Career history
- 2016–2018: Bakken Bears
- 2018: Denver Nuggets
- 2018: →Delaware Blue Coats
- 2018–2019: Hapoel Tel Aviv
- 2019: ESSM Le Portel
- 2019–2020: Oklahoma City Blue
- 2020–2021: Tofaş
- 2021–2022: Galatasaray Nef
- 2022–2024: Lokomotiv Kuban
- 2024–2025: UNICS Kazan
- 2025–2026: Shandong Hi-Speed Kirin
- 2026–present: Jilin Northeast Tigers

Career highlights
- VTB United League All-Star Game MVP (2024); All-Champions League Second Team (2022); 2× Basketligaen champion (2017, 2018); Basketligaen MVP (2017); Basketligaen Finals MVP (2017); Basketligaen scoring champion (2017); Second-team All-MVC (2016); MVC Newcomer of the Year (2015); MVC All-Newcomer Team (2015)
- Stats at NBA.com
- Stats at Basketball Reference

DeVaughn Akoon-Purcell (born June 5, 1993) is a Trinidadian-American professional basketball player for the Jilin Northeast Tigers of the Chinese Basketball Association (CBA). He played college basketball for Eastern Oklahoma State and Illinois State. Standing at 6 ft 6 in (1.98 m), he usually plays the small forward position.

== College career ==
Akoon-Purcell transferred from Eastern Oklahoma State College, where he was a National Junior College Athletic Association (NJCAA) Division I All-America Honorable Mention selection in 2014, to Illinois State University ahead of the 2014–15 season. During his junior season at Illinois State, Akoon-Purcell was named to the Missouri Valley Conference (MVC) All-Newcomer Team, and he was also named the MVC Newcomer of the Year. In 2014–15, he was also a finalist for the Riley Wallace Award, presented annually to the top transfer in NCAA Division I basketball, as awarded by CollegeInsider.com. Ahead of his senior season, Akoon-Purcell was a 2015–16 MVC Preseason Team selection. During his senior season at Illinois State, Akoon-Purcell led the team in scoring and ranked eighth in the MVC with 14.1 points per game on his way to earning All-MVC Second Team and NABC Division I District 16 Second Team accolades. Akoon-Purcell went undrafted in 2016.

== Professional career ==
=== Bakken Bears (2016–2018) ===
In August 2016, Akoon-Purcell signed a one-year contract with Danish side Bakken Bears of the Basketligaen and FIBA Europe Cup. He led the Bears to a Basketligaen championship in his first season, while being named the league's MVP and Finals MVP. In his second season with the Bears, he reached the semi-finals of the FIBA Europe Cup and won the Basketligaen championship. Akoon-Purcell was given the title of Fan Vote FIBA Europe Cup MVP, as he received 4,939 fan votes. He also was named the Guard of the Year of the competition.

=== Denver Nuggets (2018) ===
Akoon-Purcell joined the Denver Nuggets NBA Summer League roster ahead of the 2018 Las Vegas Summer League, averaging 12.0 points, 2.0 rebounds, 1.5 assists and 2.0 steals in 19.3 minutes per game. On August 7, 2018, the Denver Nuggets signed Akoon-Purcell on a two-way contract. Akoon-Purcell played in only 7 games with the Nuggets throughout the entirety of his two-way contract. On December 16, 2018, after the expiration of his two-way contract, he was waived by the Nuggets.

=== Hapoel Tel Aviv (2018–2019) ===
On December 19, 2018, Akoon-Purcell signed with Hapoel Tel Aviv of the Israeli Premier League for the rest of the season. However, on February 19, 2019, Akoon-Purcell parted ways with Hapoel after appearing in eight games.

=== ESSM Le Portel (2019) ===
On March 9, 2019, Akoon-Purcell signed with ESSM Le Portel of the French LNB Pro A. In 12 games played for Le Portel, he averaged 9.1 points and 2.5 rebounds per game.

=== Oklahoma City Blue (2019–2020) ===
On September 30, 2019, Akoon-Purcell signed with the Oklahoma City Thunder. He was cut from the team in the preseason and was signed by their G League affiliate, the Oklahoma City Blue. On January 21, 2020, Akoon-Purcell posted 33 points and 7 rebounds in a 125–116 win over the Austin Spurs. The following game, he scored 38 points while adding eight rebounds, two assists and one steal in a 144–140 loss to the Texas Legends.

=== Tofaş (2020–2021) ===
On September 2, 2020, Akoon-Purcell signed a one-month deal with the Bakken Bears. However, on September 29, he signed with Tofaş of the Turkish league.

Akoon-Purcell played for the Atlanta Hawks in the 2021 NBA summer league, scoring 13 points in 27 minutes on 6–9 shooting and grabbing 8 rebounds and 2 steals at his debut in a 85–83 loss against the Boston Celtics and former Hapoel Tel-Aviv teammate Yam Madar.

=== Galatasaray (2021–2022) ===
On August 23, 2021, Akoon-Purcell signed a one-year deal with Galatasaray Nef of the Turkish Basketbol Süper Ligi (BSL), with the option of an additional season.

=== Lokomotiv Kuban (2022–2024) ===
On December 1, 2022, he signed with Lokomotiv Kuban of the VTB United League.

=== Shandong Hi-Speed Kirin (2025–present) ===
On November 3, 2025, he signed with Shandong Hi-Speed Kirin of the CBA.

== Career statistics ==
Legend
GP	Games played	GS	Games started	MPG	Minutes per game
FG%	Field goal percentage	3P%	3-point field goal percentage	FT%	Free throw percentage
RPG	Rebounds per game	APG	Assists per game	SPG	Steals per game
BPG	Blocks per game	PPG	Points per game	**Bold**	Career high

†	Denotes seasons in which he won the championship
*	Led the league

=== NBA ===
==== Regular season ====
Year	Team	GP	GS	MPG	FG%	3P%	FT%	RPG	APG	SPG	BPG	PPG
2018–19	Denver	7	0	3.1	.300	.000	.500	.5	.8	.2	.0	1.0
Career		7	0	3.1	.300	.000	.500	.5	.8	.2	.0	1.0

=== Domestic Leagues ===
Year	Team	League	GP	GS	MPG	FG%	3P%	FT%	RPG	APG	SPG	BPG	PPG
2016–17†	(Denmark) Bakken Bears	Basketligaen	**37**	**32**	27.1	**.522**	**.455**	.799	**5.9**	3.0	**1.8**	**.4**	**21.4***
2017–18†	(Denmark) Bakken Bears	Basketligaen	29	25	27.1	.484	.352	**.881**	4.9	**3.8**	1.6	.1	17.3
2018–19	(Israel) Hapoel Tel Aviv	IPL	8	7	22.1	.310	.240	.826	2.6	1.8	1.1	.1	7.6
2018–19	(France) Le Portel	Pro A	12	2	17.2	.351	.300	.680	2.5	1.1	0.8	.0	9.1

=== European Competitions ===
Year	Team	League	GP	GS	MPG	FG%	3P%	FT%	RPG	APG	SPG	BPG	PPG
2016–17	(Denmark) Bakken Bears	BCL	14	11	29.0	.415	.340	.842	6.6	1.7	2.2	.3	17.4
2017–18	(Denmark) Bakken Bears	FEC	18	18	32.7	.415	.255	.718	5.2	4.3	1.6	.0	18.6

== Personal life ==
Akoon-Purcell was born to parents Paul Akoon Jr. and Tamar deGovia-Purcell. He moved in with his grandparents when he was aged 11. His grandmother died in April 2013; Akoon-Purcell wore a #44 jersey to honor her as she died on the fourth month of the year and he was her fourth grandchild. Akoon-Purcell also began to use his full name after her death as he was previously known as DeVaughn Purcell.

Akoon-Purcell has tattoos on each wrist dedicated to his grandmother and his former coach Torrey Ward who was killed in a plane crash in April 2015. Ward recruited Akoon-Purcell out of Eastern Oklahoma State in 2014.

Akoon-Purcell holds a Trinidadian passport.
