= Basketligaen Most Valuable Player =

The Basketligaen Most Valuable Player is an annual basketball award that is given by the Danish top tier Basketligaen. It is awarded to the player who was considered to be the best in a given regular season.

== Winners ==
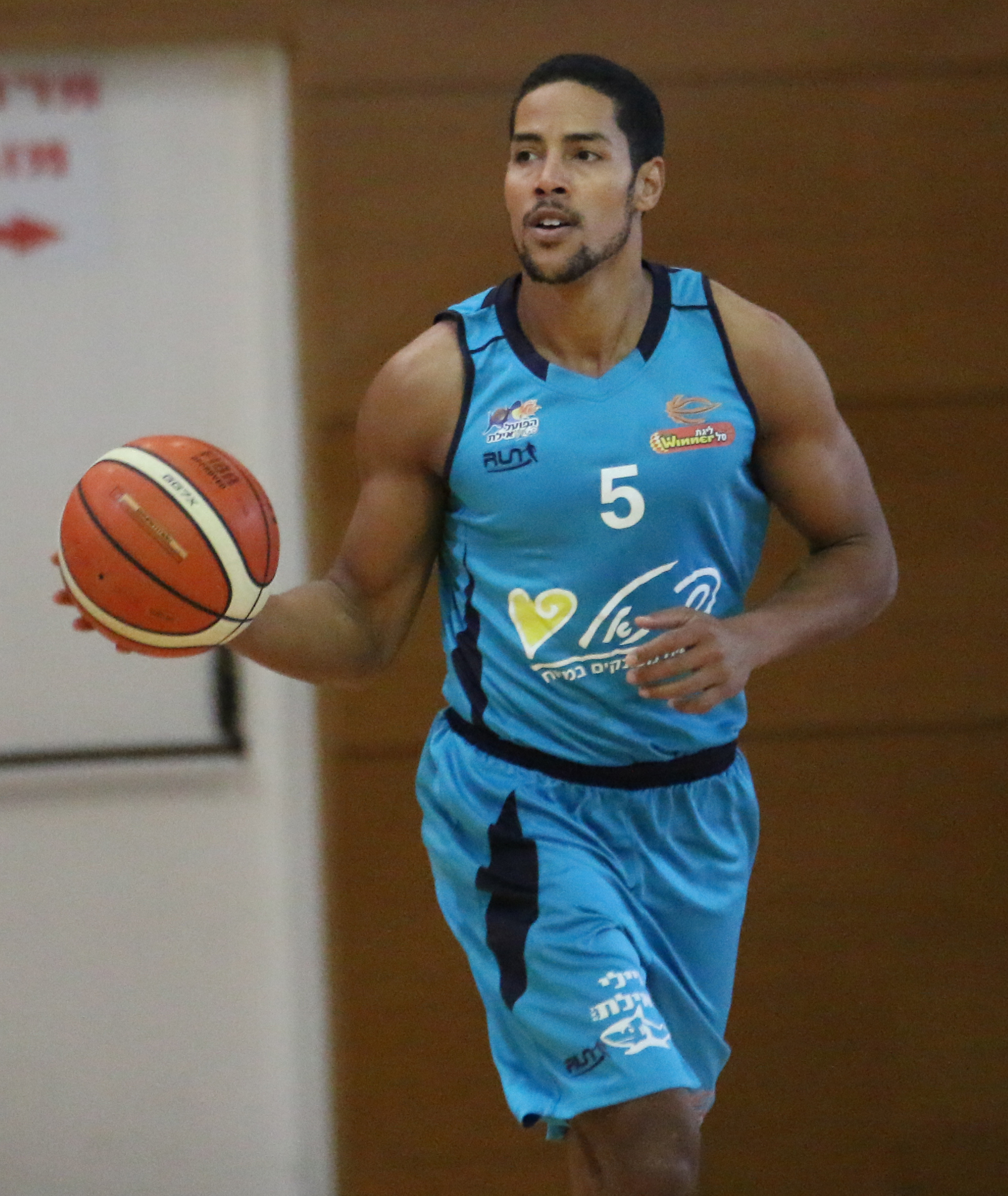
Danish-Israeli Chanan Colman won the award in 2012

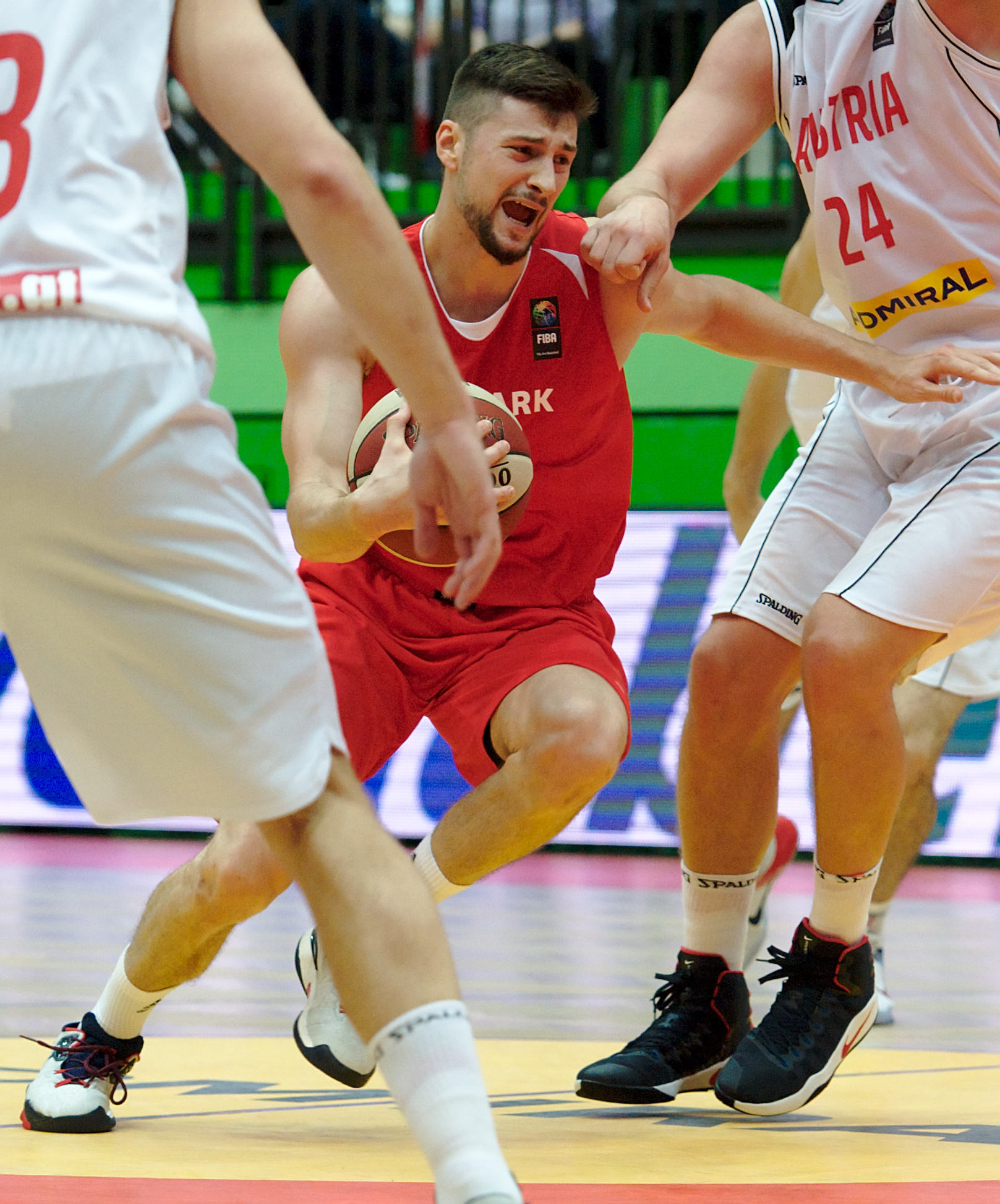
Darko Jukić won the award in 2013

^	Denotes player who is still active in the Basketligaen
*	Inducted into the FIBA Hall of Fame
†	Denotes player whose team won championship that year
Player (X)	Denotes the number of times the player has received the award

Season	Player	Position	Nationality	Team	Ref.
2002–03	Eric Bell		United States	Bakken Bears	
2003–04	Joshua Metzger		United States	Svendborg Rabbits	
2004–05	Eric Bell (2)		United States	Horsens IC	
2005–06	Thomas Skotting		Denmark	Aabyhøj IF	
2006–07	Joshua Buettner		United States	Svendborg Rabbits	
2007–08	Brandon Thomas		United States	Team FOG Næstved	
2008–09	Bonell Colas		United States	Randers Cimbria	
2009–10†	Johnell Smith		United States	Svendborg Rabbits	
2010–11	Nicolai Iversen		Denmark	Svendborg Rabbits	
2011–12	Chanan Colman	Guard	Denmark (Note: Born in Denmark, Colman also owns the Israeli nationality, due to his Israeli mother.)	Svendborg Rabbits	
2012–13	Darko Jukić^	Forward	Denmark	Horsens IC	
2013–14	Johnell Smith	Guard	United States	Svendborg Rabbits	
2014–15†	Skyler Bowlin	Guard	United States	Horsens IC	
2015–16	Brandon Rozzell	Guard	United States	Svendborg Rabbits	
2016–17†	DeVaughn Akoon-Purcell	Forward	Trinidad and Tobago (Note: DeVaughn Akoon-Purcell, born in Orlando, Florida, also owns the American nationality.)	Bakken Bears	
2017–18	Kevin Larsen	Center	Denmark	Horsens IC	
2018–19†	Ryan Evans^	Forward	United States	Bakken Bears	
2019–20	Roberto Gallinat	Guard	United States	Horsens IC	
2020–21†	QJ Peterson	Guard	United States	Bakken Bears	
2021–22	Sebastian Åris	Guard	Denmark	Svendborg Rabbits	
2022–23	Mike McGuirl	Guard	United States	Team FOG Næstved	
2023–24	Gage Davis	Guard	United States	Horsens IC	
2024–25	Jagan Mosely	Guard	United States	Team FOG Næstved	

== Players with most awards ==
Player	Editions	Notes
(United States) Eric Bell	2	2003, 2005
