= FIBA Europe Cup =

European basketball competition

- Organising body: FIBA Europe
- Founded: 30 June 2015; 11 years ago
- First season: 2015–16
- Region: Europe
- Number of teams: 48 (regular season)
- Level on pyramid: 2
- Related competitions: FIBA Champions League
- Current champions: (Spain) Bilbao Basket (2nd title) (2025–26)
- Most championships: (Spain) Bilbao Basket (2 title)
- TV partners: courtside1891.basketball
- Website: fiba.basketball
- 2026–27 FIBA Europe Cup

The FIBA Europe Cup (FEC) is an annual professional basketball competition organised by FIBA for eligible European clubs. It is FIBA Europe's second level competition. Clubs mainly qualify based on their performance in national leagues and cup competitions, although this is not the sole deciding factor. The winner is decided by a two-legged final.

The league was founded in 2015 as a replacement of the FIBA EuroChallenge.

== History ==
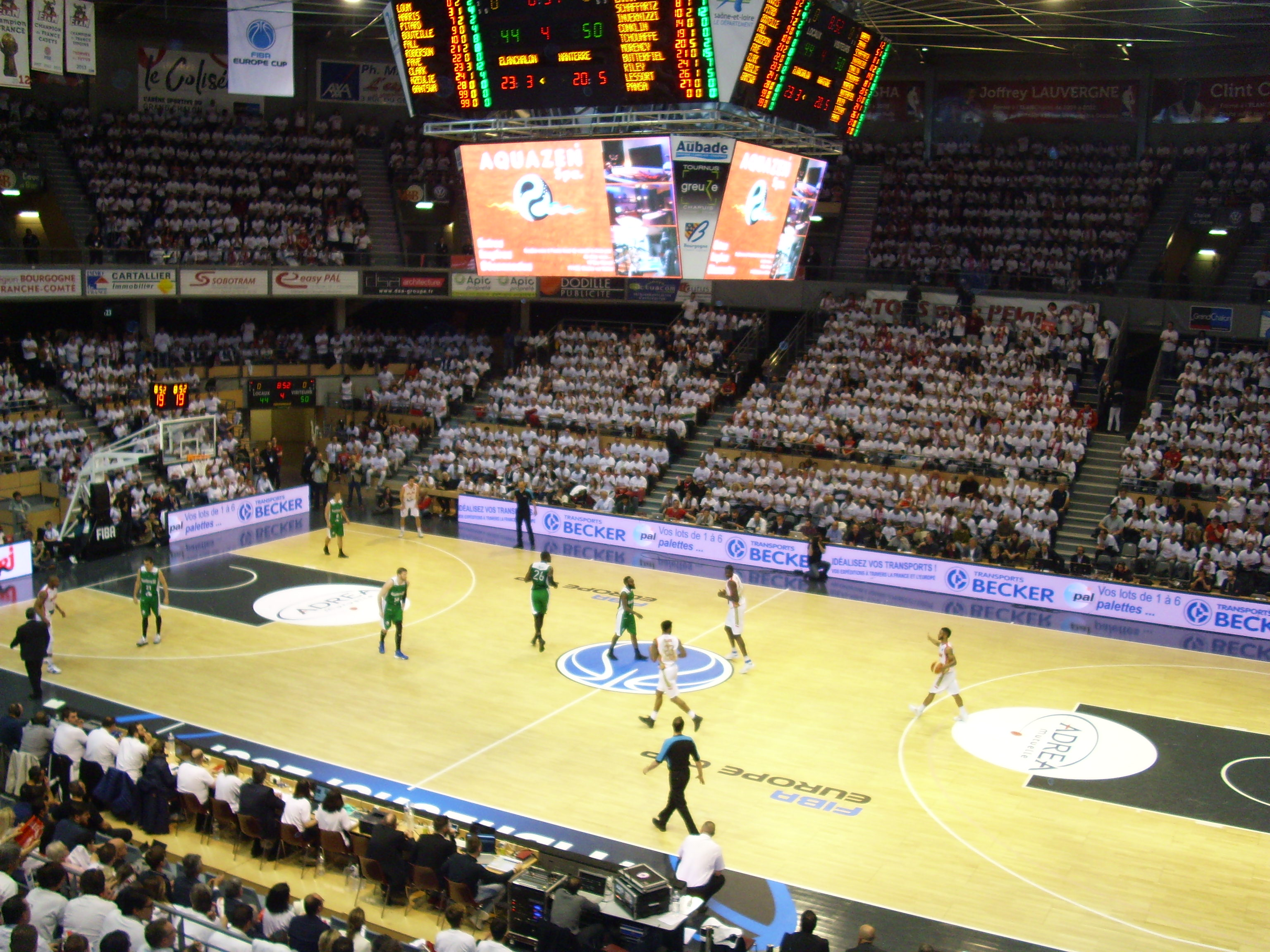
Scene of the first leg of the 2017 FIBA Europe Cup Final

On June 30, 2015, FIBA announced it would start a new league to compete with Euroleague Basketball's EuroCup. The new competition, which replaced FIBA EuroChallenge, was supposed to be open for up to 100 teams to enter. A former 4th-tier FIBA competition, the FIBA EuroCup Challenge, was named as the FIBA Europe Cup between 2003 and 2005.

The 2015–16 FIBA Europe Cup attracted 16 domestic champions and 8 runners-up, including KK Cibona, Pallacanestro Cantu, ASVEL, Pallacanestro Varese, CEZ Nymburk, BK Ventspils, PBC Academic and Krka. The first FIBA Europe Cup game was played on October 21, 2015, when Donar Groningen beat Egis Körmend 78–71. Frankfurt Skyliners won the 1st edition in a Final Four tournament and represented Europe in the 2016 FIBA Intercontinental Cup, following the FIBA-EuroLeague dispute. In the 2016–17 season, FIBA started the Basketball Champions League and since then clubs from the Champions League can be transferred to the Europe Cup through their position.

== Format ==
=== Tournament ===
The tournament proper begins with a regular season of 48 clubs divided into 8 groups. Seeding is used whilst making the draw for this stage, whilst clubs from the same country may not be drawn together. Each club meets the others in home and away games, in a round-robin format. The winner and runner-up from each group progress to the second round, with 16 clubs divided into 4 groups. For the play-offs, the winner runner-up from each group play a two-legged format. Until 2019, the fifth and sixth-placed clubs were dropped from the Basketball Champions League regular season.

== Finals ==
The Finals were played in either a Final Four tournament format or with a two-legged series.

Year	Final			Semifinalists		
Year	Champion	Score	Second place	Third place	Score	Fourth place
2015–16; Details	(Germany); Fraport Skyliners	66–62	(Italy); Openjobmetis Varese	(France); Élan Chalon	103–72	(Russia); Enisey
2016–17; Details	(France); Nanterre 92	140–137 (58–58 / 82–79)	(France); Élan Chalon	(Germany) Telekom Baskets Bonn and (Belgium) Telenet Oostende		
2017–18; Details	(Italy); Umana Reyer Venezia	158–148 (77–69 / 81–79)	(Italy); Sidigas Avellino	(Netherlands) Donar and (Denmark) Bakken Bears		
2018–19; Details	(Italy); Banco di Sardegna Sassari	170–163 (89–84 / 81–79)	(Germany) s.Oliver Würzburg	(Israel) Hapoel Holon and (Italy) OpenjobMetis Varese		
2019–20; Details	Curtailed and voided due to the COVID-19 pandemic in Europe			Semi-finalists: (Turkey) Bahçeşehir Koleji, (Denmark) Bakken Bears, (Germany) medi Bayreuth and (Turkey) Pınar Karşıyaka		
2020–21; Details	(Israel); Ironi Nes Ziona	82–74	(Poland); Arged BMSLAM Stal	(Romania); CSM Oradea	85–76	(Russia); Parma
2021–22; Details	(Turkey); Bahçeşehir Koleji	162–143 (72–69 / 90–74)	(Italy); UnaHotels Reggio Emilia	(Denmark) Bakken Bears and (Netherlands) ZZ Leiden		
2022–23; Details	(Poland); Anwil Włocławek	161–155 (81–77 / 80–78)	(France); Cholet	(Estonia) Kalev/Cramo and (Finland) Karhu		
2023–24; Details	(Germany); Niners Chemnitz	180–179 (85–74 / 95–105)	(Turkey); Bahçeşehir Koleji	(Italy) Itelyum Varese and (Spain) Surne Bilbao Basket		
2024–25; Details	(Spain); Surne Bilbao Basket	154–149 (72–65 / 82–84)	(Greece); PAOK mateco	(France) Cholet and (France) JDA Dijon		
2025–26; Details	(Spain); Surne Bilbao Basket	162–153 (89–74 / 73–79)	(Greece); PAOK	(Hungary) Falco Szombathely and (Spain) UCAM Murcia		

== Performance by club ==
Map of countries, teams from which have reached the regular season of the FIBA Europe Cup. FIBA member country that has been represented in the regular season FIBA member country that has been represented in the qualifying rounds Not represented

A total number of 140 clubs from 38 FIBA member countries have participated in the competition. The competition has been won by eight clubs from seven countries. Clubs from Italy have been most successful, as 2 won the title and 3 other finished as runners-up.

Club	Winners	Runners-up	Years won	Years runner-up
(Spain) Bilbao Basket	2	0	2025, 2026	–
(Turkey) Bahçeşehir Koleji	1	1	2022	2024
(Germany) Skyliners Frankfurt	1	0	2016	–
(France) Nanterre 92	1	0	2017	–
(Italy) Reyer Venezia	1	0	2018	–
(Italy) Dinamo Sassari	1	0	2019	–
(Israel) Ironi Nes Ziona	1	0	2021	–
(Poland) Anwil Włocławek	1	0	2023	–
(Germany) Niners Chemnitz	1	0	2024	–
(Greece) PAOK	0	2	–	2025, 2026
(Italy) Varese	0	1	–	2016
(France) Élan Chalon	0	1	–	2017
(Italy) Felice Scandone	0	1	–	2018
(Germany) Würzburg	0	1	–	2019
(Poland) Stal Ostrów Wielkopolski	0	1	–	2021
(Italy) Reggiana	0	1	–	2022
(France) Cholet Basket	0	1	–	2023

== Statistics ==
=== All-time leaders ===
Statistics as of 11 June 2022

Players in bold were active in the most recent FIBA Europe Cup season.

==== Points ====
Rank	Player	Nation	Points	Games	Per game	Years	Club(s)
1	**Michel Diouf**	SEN	931	76	12.3	2015	Bakken Bears
2	**Trae Golden**	USA	897	51	17.6	2015	ETHA Engomis, ESSM Le Portel, Avtodor, Bahçeşehir Koleji
3	**Darko Jukić**	DEN	728	71	11.8	2015	Bakken Bears
4	Worthy de Jong	NED	782	51	14.3	2015–2022	ZZ Leiden
5	Ryan Evans	USA	616	46	12.4	2018–	Bakken Bears

==== Rebounds ====
Rank	Player	Nation	Rebounds	Games	Per game	Years	Club(s)
1	**Michel Diouf**	SEN	463	73	6.3	2015–	Bakken Bears
2	**Tony Taylor**	USA	318	36	8.8	2016–	Enisey, Karşıyaka
3	**Darko Jukić**	DEN	308	74	4.2	2015–	Bakken Bears
4	Željko Šakić	CRO	291	42	6.9	2015–2022	Cluj-Napoca, Avtodor
5	**Thomas Koenis**	NED	279	52	5.4	2015–2022	ZZ Leiden, Donar

==== Assists ====
Rank	Player	Nation	Assists	Games	Per game	Years	Club(s)
1	**Trae Golden**	USA	298	51	5.8	2015–	ETHA Engomis, ESSM Le Portel, Avtodor, Bahçeşehir Koleji
2	John Roberson	USA	318	36	8.8	2016–	Élan Chalon, ASVEL, Enisey
3	Adama Darboe	DEN	229	60	3.8	2015–	Bakken Bears
4	Worthy de Jong	NED	208	51	4.1	2015–2022	ZZ Leiden
5	**Tony Taylor**	USA	188	49	8.8	2016–	Enisey, Karşıyaka

=== Single game records ===
	Category	
Efficiency	(United States) Chase Fieler	46
Points	(United States) (Bosnia and Herzegovina) John Roberson	39
Points	(United States) Spencer Butterfield	39
Rebounds	(United States) Travis Taylor	21
Assists	(Finland) Teemu Rannikko	18
Steals	(United States) Kim Adams	9
Blocks	(Serbia) Dejan Kravić	6
Blocks	(Estonia) Janar Talts	6
Three-pointers	(United States) Spencer Butterfield	11

Source: FIBA Europe Cup As of 2 May 2017.

== Awards ==
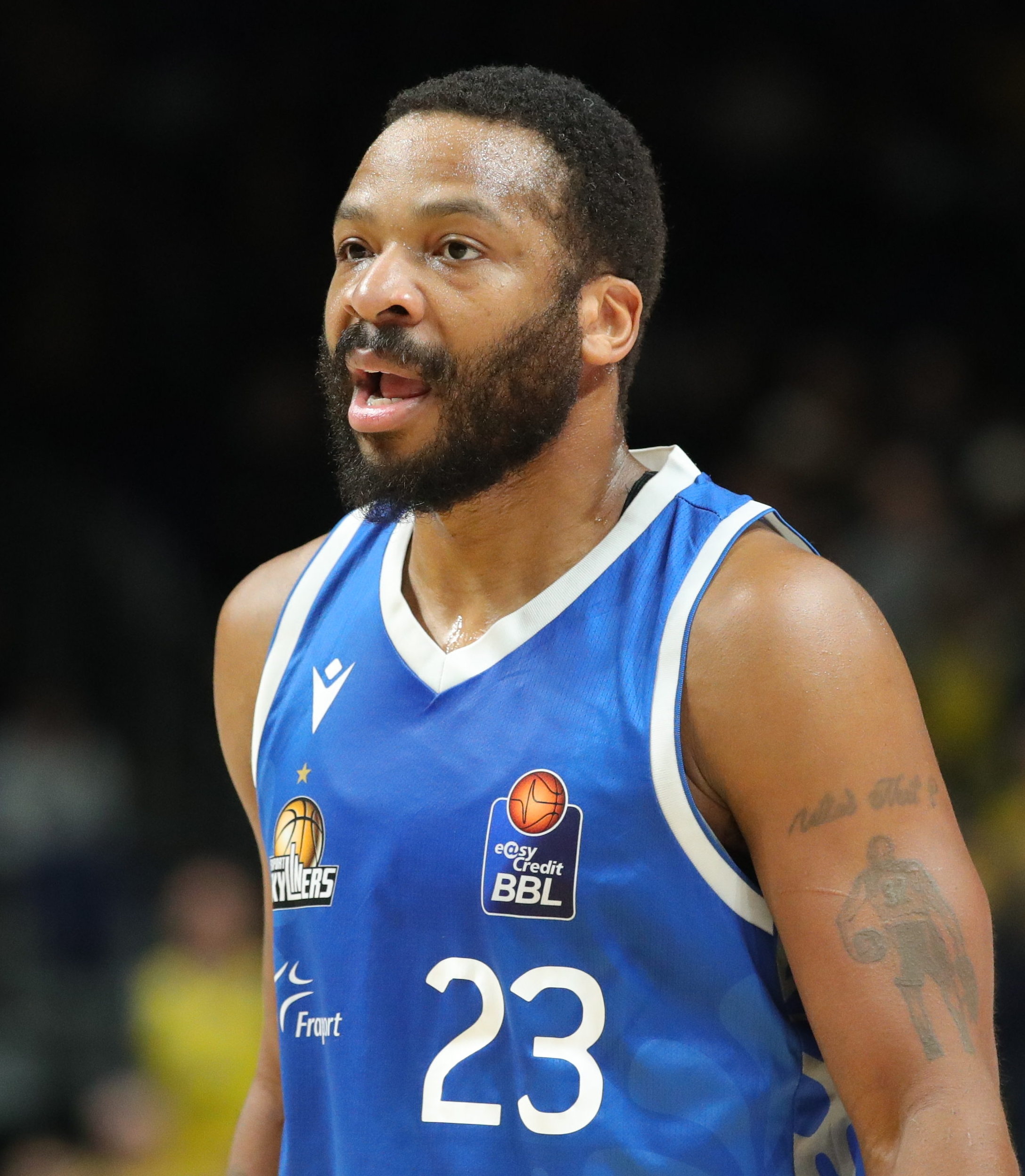
Quantez Robertson was the FIBA Europe Cup Final Four MVP in 2016.

After each round, the FIBA Europe Cup awards the "Top Performer" honour to the best player of the given round. In its inaugural season, in 2016, the competition had a Final Four MVP award for the best player of its final four. The final four format was later abandoned in favor of playoffs with two-legged finals. Since 2020, the league awards a Final MVP trophy again.

== Winning coaches and captains ==
Year	Coach	Team	Captain
2016	(Canada) Gordon Herbert	Fraport Skyliners	(United States) Quantez Robertson
2017	(France) Pascal Donnadieu	Nanterre 92	(Germany) Heiko Schaffartzik
2018	(Italy) Walter De Raffaele	Umana Reyer Venezia	(United States) Tomas Ress
2019	(Italy) Gianmarco Pozzecco	Dinamo Sassari	(Italy) Giacomo Devecchi
2021	(United States) Brad Greenberg	Ironi Nes Ziona	(Israel) Tal Dunne
2022	(Turkey) Erhan Ernak	Bahçeşehir Koleji	(Turkey) Oğuz Savaş
2023	(Poland) Przemysław Frasunkiewicz	Anwil Włocławek	(Poland) Kamil Łączyński
2024	(Argentina) Rodrigo Pastore	Niners Chemnitz	(Germany) Jonas Richter
2025	(Spain) Jaume Ponsarnau	Bilbao Basket	(Spain) Xavi Rabaseda
2026	(Spain) Jaume Ponsarnau	Bilbao Basket	(Iceland) Tryggvi Hlinason

== See also ==
=== Men's competitions ===
- Basketball Champions League
- EuroLeague
- EuroCup Basketball

=== Women's competitions ===
- EuroLeague Women
- EuroCup Women
- FIBA Europe SuperCup Women
