= Skyler Bowlin =

American professional basketball player

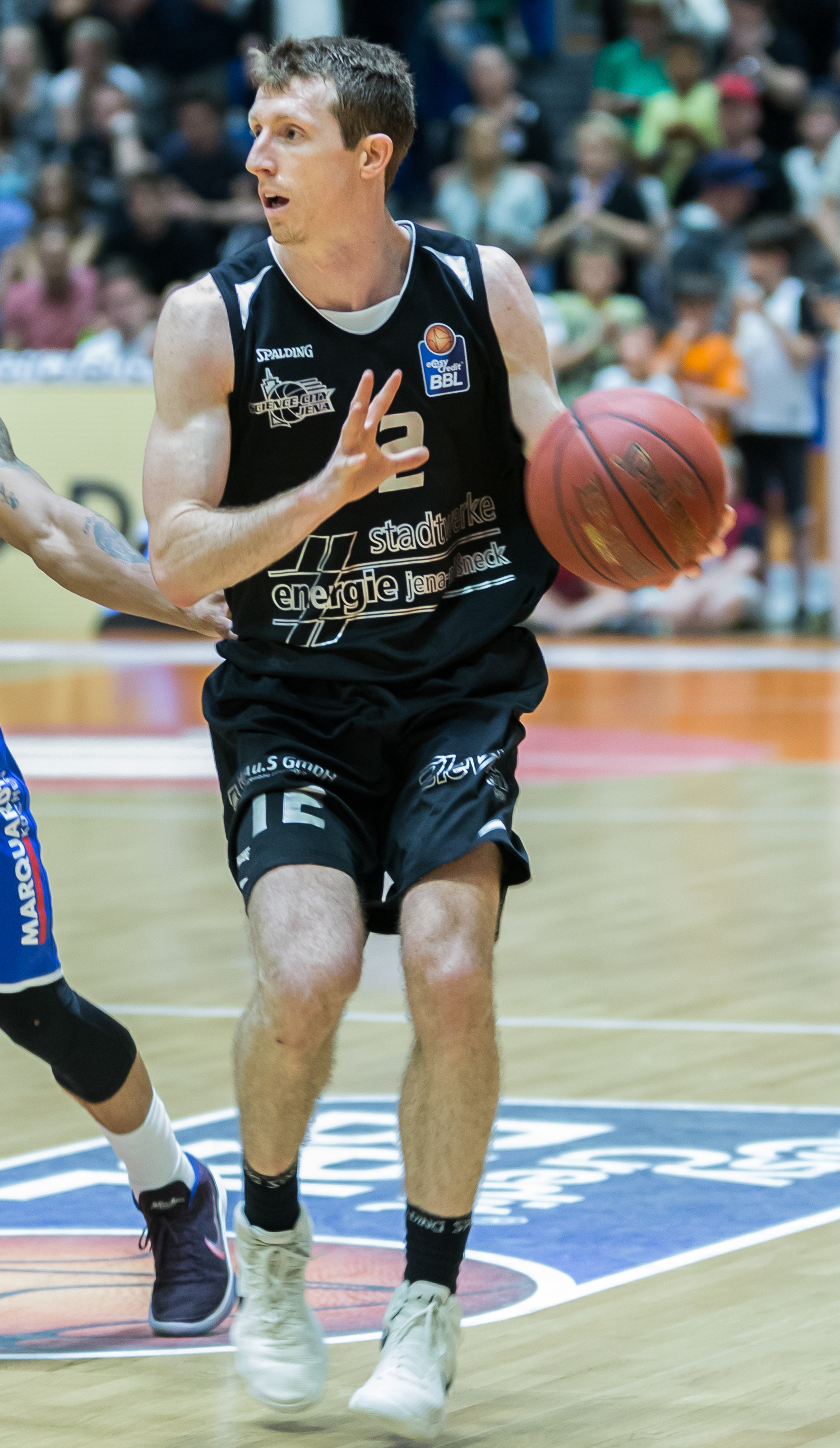
- Bowlin playing with Jena in 2018

Bakken Bears
- Title: Head coach
- League: Basketligaen

Personal information
- Born: July 13, 1989 (age 37) Paragould, Arkansas
- Listed height: 1.92 m (6 ft 4 in)
- Listed weight: 77 kg (170 lb)

Career information
- High school: Greene County Tech (Paragould, Arkansas)
- College: Missouri Southern (2007–2011)
- NBA draft: 2011: undrafted
- Playing career: 2011–2025
- Position: Point guard / shooting guard
- Number: 12

Career history

Playing
- 2011–2012: Topstar Kangaroos
- 2012–2015: Horsens IC
- 2013: →WBC Wels
- 2015–2016: Södertälje Kings
- 2016–2017: Gießen 46ers
- 2017–2018: Science City Jena
- 2018–2020: s.Oliver Würzburg
- 2020–2021: Iraklis Thessaloniki
- 2021: Zielona Góra
- 2021–2022: Telekom Baskets Bonn
- 2022–2025: Bakken Bears

Coaching
- 2025–present: Bakken Bears

Career highlights
- Swedish League Finals MVP (2016); Swedish League champion (2016); Danish Cup MVP (2015); Danish Cup winner (2015); Danish League champion (2015); Danish League MVP (2015)

Skyler Bowlin (born July 13, 1989) is an American professional basketball coach and former player. He is currently head coach for the Bakken Bears of the Danish Basketligaen. Bowlin played at both the point guard and shooting guard positions during his professional career.

== Professional career ==
In the 2015–16 season, he was named the Basketligan Finals MVP after he won the Basketligan with the Södertälje Kings. After the season in Sweden ended, he signed with Gießen 46ers for the 2016–17 season. In 33 games, Bowlin averaged 8.8 points and 4.1 assists for Gießen.

On May 13, 2017, Bowlin signed with Science City Jena for the 2017–18 season. He averaged 11.6 points and 5.2 assists per game. Bowlin signed a two-year deal with s.Oliver Würzburg on May 25, 2018.

On July 19, 2020, Bowlin officially signed with Iraklis of the Greek Basket League. On February 18, 2021, Bowlin parted ways with the Greek club. Following a stint at Basket Zielona Góra in Poland, Bowlin returned to the German Bundesliga, agreeing terms with the Telekom Baskets Bonn in June 2021.

In June 2022, he signed a two-year deal with the Bakken Bears of the Danish Basketligaen.

== Coaching career ==
On June 8, 2025, he was announced as the head coach of the Bakken Bears of the Danish Basketligaen following his retirement from professional basketball.

== Honours ==
=== Club ===
Bakken Bears

- Basketligaen: 2014–15
- Danish Cup: 2015

Södertälje Kings

- Basketligan: 2015–16

=== Individual ===
- Basketligaen MVP: 2015
- Danish Cup MVP: 2015
- Basketligan Finals MVP: 2016
