= Kevin Larsen (basketball) =

Danish basketball player (born 1993)

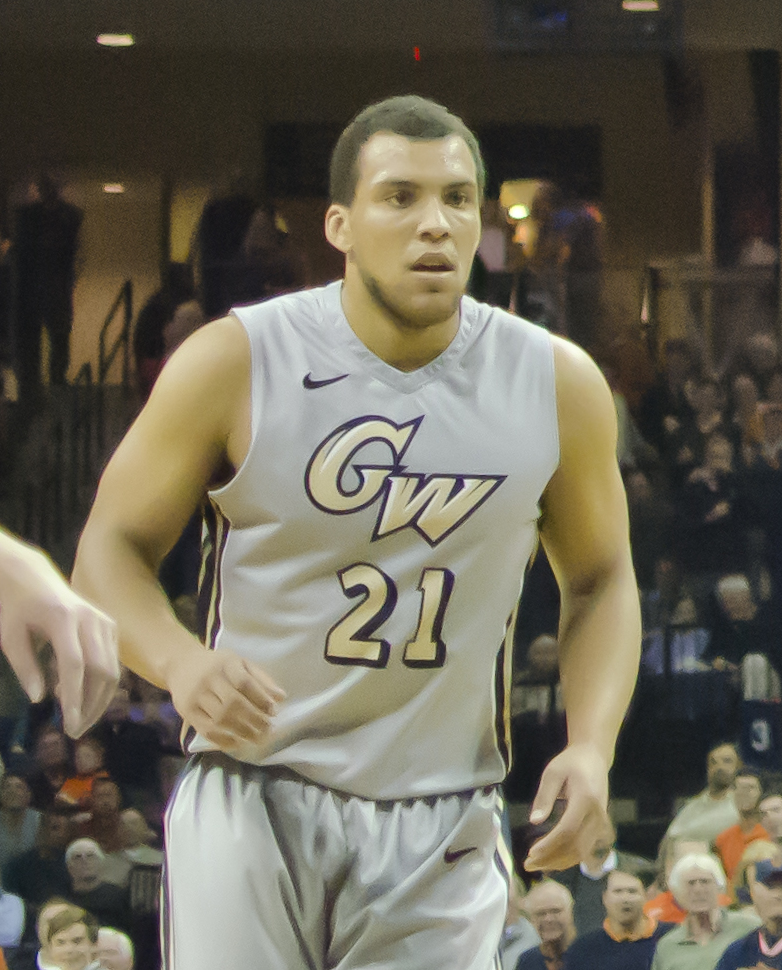
- Larsen with George Washington in 2014

No. 13 – HLA Alicante
- Position: Center
- League: Primera FEB

Personal information
- Born: July 17, 1993 (age 32) Copenhagen, Denmark
- Listed height: 2.08 m (6 ft 10 in)
- Listed weight: 112 kg (247 lb)

Career information
- College: George Washington (2012–2016)
- NBA draft: 2016: undrafted
- Playing career: 2016–present

Career history
- 2016–2017: Lille Métropole
- 2017: Mitteldeutscher
- 2017–2018: Horsens IC
- 2018–2019: Bilbao Basket
- 2019–2020: Palencia
- 2020–2021: Breogán
- 2021–2024: Estudiantes
- 2024–present: HLA Alicante

Career highlights
- Basketligaen MVP (2018); ProA champion (2017); 2016 NIT Champion [GWU]; Third-team All-Atlantic 10 (2015); Atlantic 10 Most Improved Player (2014)

Kevin Ricki Larsen (born July 17, 1993) is a Danish basketball player for HLA Alicante of the Primera FEB. Standing at 2.08 m (6 ft 10 in), he either plays as power forward or center. Larsen played college basketball for the George Washington Colonials.

== Professional career ==
On August 6, 2016, Larsen signed his first contract with French side Lille Métropole. In January 2017, he signed with ProA side Mitteldeutscher BC. With Mitteldeutscher, he won the championship and gained promotion to the Basketball Bundesliga (BBL), the German first tier.

For the 2017–18 season, he returned to his home country to sign with Horsens IC. After the season, he was named the Basketligaen MVP. He averaged 19.2 points, 7.2 rebounds and 3.2 assists per game.

On August 7, 2018, Larsen signed with RETAbet Bilbao Basket of the LEB Oro. On July 12, 2019, Larsen signed with Chocolates Trapa Palencia of the LEB Oro. He averaged 14.2 points, 6.3 rebounds and 2.1 assists per game and was voted to Eurobasket.com All-Spanish LEB Gold 2nd Team. On July 15, 2020, Larsen signed with Breogán. On December 27, 2021, he signed with Movistar Estudiantes.
