= Brandon Rozzell =

American basketball player (born 1989)

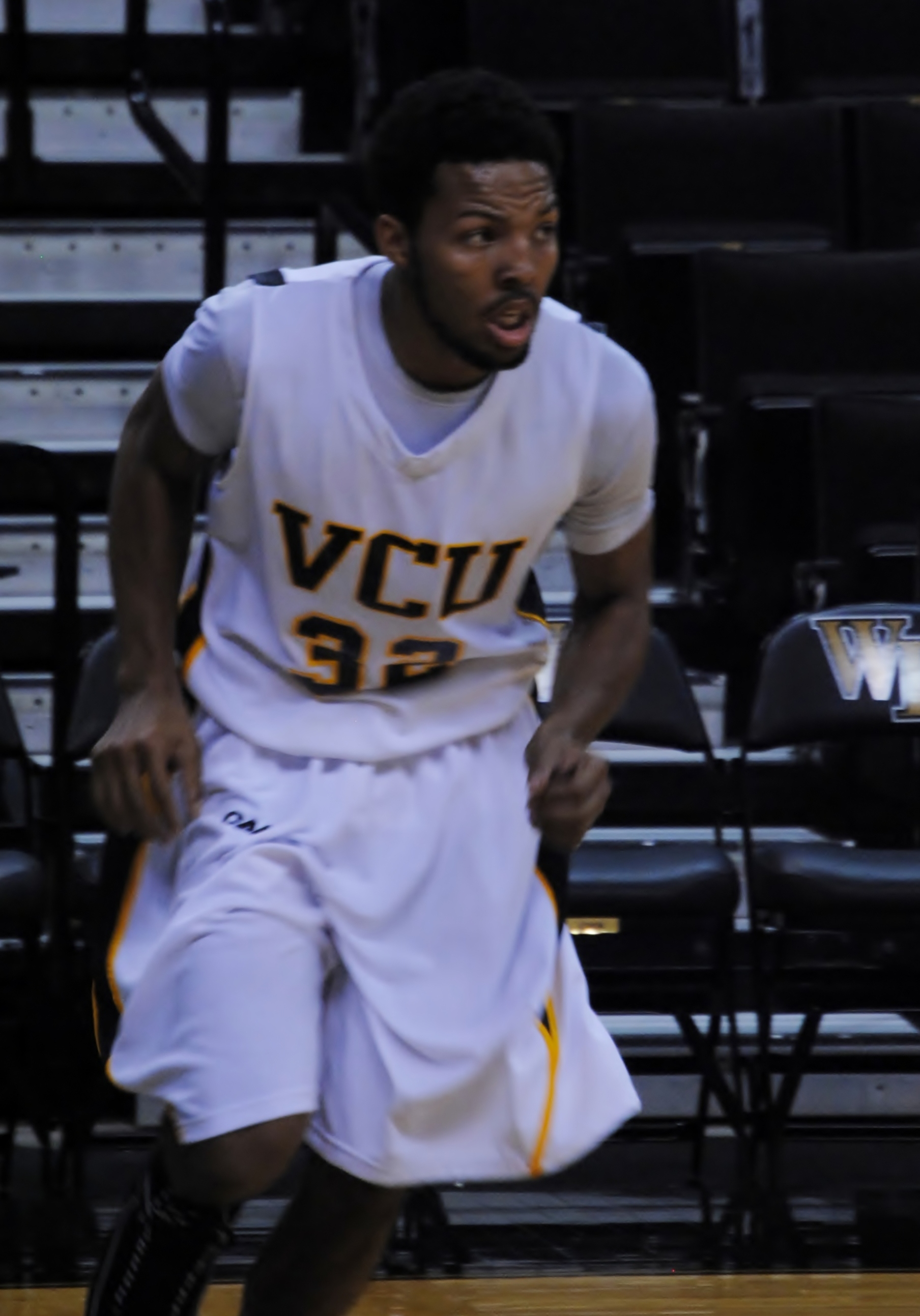
- Rozzell playing for VCU

VCU Rams
- Title: Assistant coach
- League: Atlantic 10 Conference

Personal information
- Born: March 27, 1989 (age 37) Richmond, Virginia, U.S.
- Listed height: 6 ft 2 in (1.88 m)
- Listed weight: 185 lb (84 kg)

Career information
- High school: Highland Springs (Highland Springs, Virginia)
- College: VCU (2007–2011)
- Playing career: 2011–2021
- Position: Shooting guard
- Number: 32
- Coaching career: 2021–present

Career history

Playing
- 2012: Aris Leeuwarden
- 2014: Ferreteria Brenes Barva
- 2015: Escazu
- 2015–2016: Svendborg Rabbits
- 2016–2018: Luleå
- 2018: Okapi Aalstar
- 2018–2019: Stjarnan
- 2019–2020: Luleå
- 2020–2021: Keravnos

Coaching
- 2021–2023: VCU (director of student-athlete development)
- 2023–2025: Penn State (director of recruiting)
- 2025–present: VCU (assistant)

Career highlights
- Danish League MVP (2016); Swedish League Finals MVP (2017); Swedish League champion (2017); Icelandic Cup winner (2019); Icelandic Cup MVP (2019); Úrvalsdeild karla scoring champion (2019)

Brandon Rozzell (born March 27, 1989) is an American professional basketball coach and former player. He is currently an assistant coach for the VCU Rams of the Atlantic 10 Conference.

== Professional career ==
In February 2012, Rozzell signed with Aris Leeuwarden of the Dutch Basketball League (DBL).

He played for Ferreteria Brenes Barva in 2014 and Escazu in 2015 in the Costa Rica LBS.

In 2016, he was named the Basketligaen Most Valuable Player after averaging 24.7 points and 5.8 assist for Svendborg Rabbits.

The following season, Rozzell moved to Luleå of the Basketligan where he won the Swedish championship in 2017 and was also named the Finals MVP.

In December 2018, Rozzell signed with Stjarnan of the Úrvalsdeild karla, where he was reunited with his former Svendborg Rabbits coach Arnar Guðjónsson. In his Úrvalsdeild debut, Rozzell scored 37 points in Stjarnan's 106–83 win against ÍR. On 17 February 2019, Rozzell scored 30 points in Stjarnan's 84–68 victory against Njarðvík in the Icelandic Cup finals. For his effort he was named the Cup Finals MVP.

In August 2019, Rozzell returned to BC Luleå. He averaged 21.6 points per game. On August 2, 2020, Rozzell signed with Keravnos of the Cyprus Basketball Division 1.

== Titles, awards and achievements ==
=== Titles ===
- Swedish League champion: 2017
- Icelandic Cup: 2019

=== Awards ===
- Danish League MVP: 2016
- Swedish League Finals MVP 2017
- Icelandic Cup MVP: 2019

=== Achievements ===
- Úrvalsdeild karla scoring champion: 2019
