= Marvelle Harris =

American basketball player

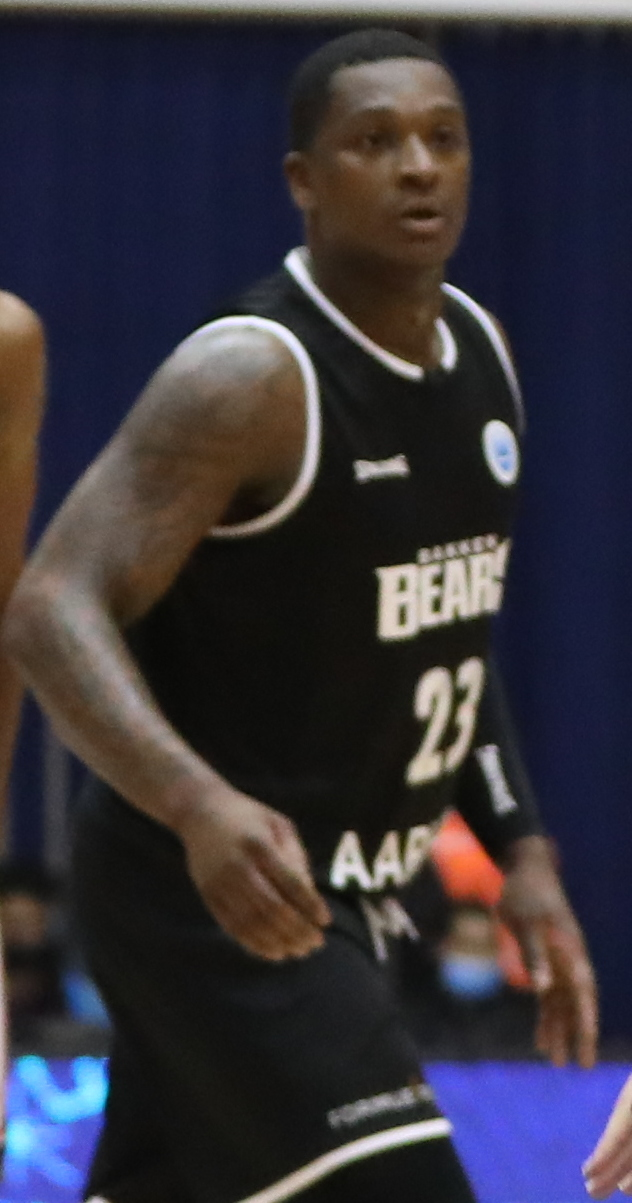
- Harris with Bakken Bears in 2021

Free agent
- Position: Shooting guard

Personal information
- Born: December 16, 1993 (age 32)
- Listed height: 193 cm (6 ft 4 in)
- Listed weight: 94 kg (207 lb)

Career information
- High school: Eisenhower (Rialto, California)
- College: Fresno State (2012–2016)
- NBA draft: 2016: undrafted
- Playing career: 2016–present

Career history
- 2016–2017: Illawarra Hawks
- 2017–2018: Louaize Club
- 2018: Limburg United
- 2018–2019: Al Mouttahed Tripoli
- 2019: Beirut Club
- 2019–2020: Al Ittihad
- 2020: Kumamoto Volters
- 2021–2022: Bakken Bears
- 2022–2023: Rizing Zephyr Fukuoka
- 2023–Present: Al-Nasr SC

Career highlights
- Basketligaen Finals MVP (2022); AP Honorable Mention All-American (2016); Mountain West Player of the Year (2016); 2× First-team All-Mountain West (2015, 2016); Mountain West tournament MVP (2016)

Marvelle Martray Harris (born December 16, 1993) is an American basketball player who belongs to the Guaros de Lara squad of the SPB. At 1.93 meters tall, he plays in the shooting guard position.

== College career ==
Harris, a 6'4" shooting guard from Eisenhower High School in Rialto, California, came to Fresno State in 2012 and went on to have one of the best careers in school history. He finished his career as the Bulldogs' career scoring leader and was named the Mountain West Player of the Year as a senior. He also led the Bulldogs to the 2016 NCAA tournament after leading the team to a Mountain West championship in the 2016 conference tournament. Harris was named tournament MVP after averaging 17.7 points per game.

== Professional career ==
After going undrafted in the 2016 NBA draft, Harris joined the New York Knicks for the 2016 NBA Summer League. On August 17, 2016, he signed with the Illawarra Hawks for the 2016–17 NBL season. He made his debut for the Hawks in their season opener on October 7, 2016, scoring 21 points as a starter in a 122–88 win over the Adelaide 36ers. Six days later, he had a 23-point effort in an 88–84 loss to the Sydney Kings. On October 28, 2016, he scored a game-high 27 points in an 81–76 win over the Perth Wildcats. Harris started the season strong, but an ankle injury in November saw his form drop off in December. He helped the Hawks finish the regular season in fourth place with a 15–13 record, and helped them win through to the best-of-five grand final series. However, he missed Game 1 of the series after returning home to Los Angeles to be with his critically ill father. The Hawks went on to lose the series in a 3–0 sweep. Harris appeared in 32 games for the Hawks in 2016–17, averaging 10.8 points, 2.7 rebounds, 1.8 assists and 1.1 steals per game.

On October 9, 2021, he has signed with Bakken Bears of the Basketligaen.

=== The Basketball Tournament ===
In the summer of 2017, Marvelle played in The Basketball Tournament (TBT) for Team Challenge ALS. He averaged 10.5 points per game (PPG), while also shooting 78 percent from the free-throw line. Marvelle helped take the sixth-seeded Team Challenge ALS to the championship game of the tournament, where they lost in a close game to Overseas Elite, 86–83. In TBT 2018, Harris averaged 16.0 points per game, 4.5 rebounds per game and 1.5 assists per game for Team Challenge ALS. They reached the West Regional championship game before losing to eventual tournament runner-up Eberlein Drive. In TBT 2021, Harris led all scorers in the tournament with 23.3 PPG, the highest of players appearing in at least three games.
