= Jaye Crockett =

American basketball player

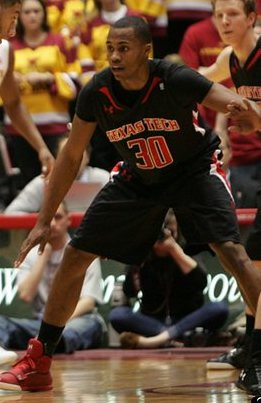
- Crockett in 2012

No. 30 – Keravnos
- Position: Power forward / small forward
- League: Cyprus Basketball Division 1

Personal information
- Born: October 16, 1991 (age 34) Watertown, New York, U.S.
- Listed height: 6 ft 7 in (2.01 m)
- Listed weight: 200 lb (91 kg)

Career information
- High school: Clovis (Clovis, New Mexico)
- College: Texas Tech (2010–2014)
- NBA draft: 2014: undrafted
- Playing career: 2014–present

Career history
- 2014–2015: Derthona Basket
- 2015: Shinshu Brave Warriors
- 2016: SAM Massagno
- 2016–2017: Forlì
- 2017: Trapani
- 2017–2018: Bakken Bears
- 2018–2019: Le Portel
- 2019: Anibal Zahle
- 2019: South East Melbourne Phoenix
- 2020: Astana
- 2020: Fribourg Olympic
- 2020–2021: Peristeri
- 2021–2022: Södertälje
- 2022–2023: Karhu Basket
- 2023: Akita Northern Happinets
- 2023–present: Keravnos

Career highlights
- Cypriot League champion (2024); 2x Cypriot Cup winner (2024, 2025); Basketligaen champion (2018); Basketligaen Finals MVP (2018); Danish Cup winner (2018); Italian LNP All-Star (2015); Third-team All-Big 12 (2014)

Jeffrey "Jaye" Crockett (born October 16, 1991) is an American professional basketball player for Keravnos of the Cyprus Basketball Division 1. He played college basketball for Texas Tech before playing professionally in Italy, Japan, Switzerland, Denmark, France, Lebanon, Australia and Greece.

== College career ==
Crockett played four years of college basketball for Texas Tech, where he was named Big 12 All-Academic second team in 2012, All-Big 12 Honorable Mention in 2013, and third-team All-Big 12 in 2014. In 125 games, he made 42 starts and averaged 9.9 points and 5.4 rebounds per game.

== Professional career ==
Crockett began his professional career in Italy, spending the 2014–15 season with Derthona Basket in the Serie A2 Basket. For the 2015–16 season, he started with the Shinshu Brave Warriors in Japan, before finishing with SAM Massagno in Switzerland. For the 2016–17 season, he returned to Italy, splitting the year with Forlì and Trapani. For the 2017–18 season, he played in Denmark with the Bakken Bears and helped the team win the Danish Cup and the Danish League. He subsequently earned Basketligaen Finals MVP honors.

Crockett's 2018–19 season in France with Le Portel was marred by injury, starting with a heel injury at the beginning of the season and then a season-ending toe injury in January 2019.

After starting the 2019–20 season in Lebanon with Anibal Zahle, Crockett signed with the South East Melbourne Phoenix of the Australian NBL as a temporary injury replacement for Tai Wesley on October 16, 2019. He parted ways with the Phoenix on December 6, 2019, following Wesley's return from injury. In January 2020, he joined Astana of the Kazakhstan Basketball Championship. Crockett signed a three-month contract with Fribourg Olympic in Switzerland on August 12. On November 30, he signed with Peristeri of the Greek Basket League.
