= Corin Henry =

American basketball player

No. 12 – Sabah
- Position: Point guard
- League: Azerbaijan Basketball League

Personal information
- Born: October 5, 1988 (age 37) Randallstown, Maryland, U.S.
- Listed height: 5 ft 11 in (1.80 m)
- Listed weight: 170 lb (77 kg)

Career information
- High school: New Town (Owings Mills, Maryland)
- College: Ranger College (2007–2009); Tarleton State (2009–2011)
- NBA draft: 2011: undrafted
- Playing career: 2011–present

Career history
- 2011–2012: Team FOG Næstved
- 2012–2013: Sydney Kings
- 2013: Rilski Sportist
- 2014: Waikato Pistons
- 2014–2015: Team FOG Næstved
- 2015–2016: Jämtland Basket
- 2016: Sandringham Sabres
- 2016–2017: ALM Évreux Basket
- 2017–2018: Düzce Belediye
- 2018: Defensor Sporting Club
- 2019: Sixt Primorska
- 2021: Exxon Sports Club
- 2022–2023: Kocaeli BŞB Kağıtspor
- 2023–present: Sabah

Career highlights
- Slovenian League champion (2019); ABA League 2 champion (2019); Slovenian Cup winner (2019); Swedish League scoring champion (2016); All-Danish League First Team (2012); Danish League Defensive Player of the Year (2012); Danish League All-Sar (2012); LSC South Division Defensive Player of the Year (2011); All-LSC South Division First Team (2011)

Corin Darius Henry (born October 5, 1988) is an American professional basketball player for Sabah BC in the Azerbaijan Basketball League. He played college basketball for Ranger College and Tarleton State University.

== High school career ==
Henry attended New Town High School in Owings Mills, Maryland. In his senior year, he averaged 24.9 points per game and helped the team make the state semi-finals with a win-loss record of 20–4.

== College career ==
=== Ranger College ===
Henry attended Ranger College in Ranger, Texas from 2007 to 2009. In his sophomore season in 2008–09, he was a first team selection to the North Texas Junior College Athletic All-Conference Team. He averaged 14.4 points, 3.3 assists and 1.8 steals per game while helping his team to a 20–10 record.

=== Tarleton State University ===
In 2009, Henry transferred to Tarleton State University in Stephenville, Texas for his remaining two college years. In his junior season in 2009–10, he was selected to the LSC All-Tournament Team and was an All-LSC Honorable Mention selection. In 32 games for the Texans, he averaged 11.8 points, 4.2 assists, 3.8 rebounds and 1.7 steals in 30.4 minutes per game.

In his senior season, he was named the 2011 All-LSC South Division Defensive Player of the Year, as well as named to the All-LSC South Division First Team. Henry led the Texans in scoring, assists and steals per game. In 30 games, he averaged 14.2 points, 4.2 assists, 2.9 rebounds and 1.8 steals in 30.1 minutes per game.

== Professional career ==
=== 2011–12 season ===
On June 21, 2011, Henry signed with Team FOG Næstved of Denmark for the 2011–12 season. In 37 games, he averaged 22.1 points, 5.1 assists, 4.4 rebounds and 3.4 steals per game. Henry led Næstved to the semi-finals but they were eliminated in a 90–75 Game 5 loss to Svendborg Rabbits, despite Henry scoring a game-high 27 points, and also adding 8 rebounds and 3 assists.

=== 2012–13 season ===
On May 24, 2012, Henry signed with the Sydney Kings for the 2012–13 NBL season.

He quickly adapted to the NBL and was named player of the week in Round 2 and Round 10. Henry was later voted a reserve for the 2012 North All-Stars. He did not make the game after he was hospitalized due to dehydration, and Jamar Wilson of the Cairns Taipans was brought in as his replacement.

On February 9, 2013, against the New Zealand Breakers, Henry suffered a hard fall that resulted in a torn wrist tendon, effectively ruling him out of the remaining 6 games of the regular season for the Kings. In 22 games for the Kings in 2012–13, he averaged 13.2 points, 3.9 rebounds, 2.9 assists and 1.1 steals per game.

=== 2013–14 season ===
In August 2013, Henry signed with BC Rilski Sportist of Bulgaria for the 2013–14 season. In November 2013, he left Rilski after appearing in just eight games.

On March 24, 2014, Henry signed with the Waikato Pistons for the 2014 New Zealand NBL season. He appeared in all 18 games for the Pistons in 2014, averaging 19.3 points, 4.1 rebounds, 5.5 assists and 1.9 steals per game.

=== 2014–15 season ===
On December 16, 2014, Henry signed with Team FOG Næstved of Denmark for the rest of the 2014–15 season, returning to the club for a second stint. In 21 games for Næstved, he averaged 17.2 points, 5.1 rebounds, 5.6 assists and 2.3 steals per game.

=== 2015–16 season ===
In July 2015, Henry signed with Jämtland Basket of Sweden for the 2015–16 season. In 32 games for the club, he averaged 20.6 points, 4.3 rebounds, 5.7 assists and 2.1 steals per game.

On May 27, 2016, Henry signed with the Sandringham Sabres for the rest of the 2016 SEABL season. In 15 games for the Sabres, he averaged 12.4 points, 3.9 rebounds and 3.5 assists per game.

=== 2016–17 season ===
On June 29, 2016, Henry signed with ALM Évreux Basket of France for the 2016–17 season.

=== 2017–18 season ===
In July 2017, Henry signed with Düzce Belediye of the Turkish Basketball First League.

=== 2021–22 season ===
On January 25, 2022, Henry signed with Kocaeli BŞB Kağıtspor of the Turkish Basketball First League.

=== 2023–24 season ===
For the 2023–24 season, Henry joined Azerbaijani club Sabah BC.

== Personal ==
Henry is the son of Carol Henry and Orin Henry, and has two siblings, Jamillah and Jamel.
