= Chris Christoffersen =

Danish basketball player (born 1979)

Personal information
- Born: 13 August 1979 (age 47) Aarsballe, Bornholm
- Listed height: 7 ft 2 in (2.18 m)
- Listed weight: 277 lb (126 kg)

Career information
- High school: Nordhoff (Ojai, California)
- College: Oregon (1998–2002)
- NBA draft: 2002: undrafted
- Playing career: 2002–2019
- Position: Center
- Number: 14

Career history
- 2002–2003: Scavolini Pesaro
- 2003–2004: Roanoke Dazzle
- 2004: Fayetteville Patriots
- 2004–2006: Bakken Bears
- 2005–2006: →Lappeenrannan NMKY
- 2006–2007: Södertälje Kings
- 2007–2019: Bakken Bears
- 2009: →Willetton Tigers

Career highlights
- 10× Danish League champion (2005, 2008, 2009, 2011–2014, 2017, 2018, 2019); 7× Danish Cup winner (2005, 2009–2011, 2013, 2016, 2018); Danish League Finals MVP (2013); 2× Danish League All-Star (2008, 2011); SBL blocks leader (2009); Finnish League champion (2006); Finnish Cup winner (2006)

Chris Christoffersen (born 13 August 1979) is a Danish retired professional basketball player. He played the majority of his career with Bakken Bears of the Danish Basketligaen. He is a ten-time Danish League champion, having been a stalwart with Bakken in 14 seasons. He has also had stints in Italy, the NBA Development League, Finland, Sweden and Australia.

== Career ==
In the mid-1990s, Christoffersen moved to the United States to attend Nordhoff High School. At that time, he had only one year of organized basketball under his belt. He then played four years of college basketball for the Oregon Ducks between 1998 and 2002. In 93 career games for Oregon, he averaged 4.8 points and 3.1 rebounds per game.

His professional career began in Italy with Scavolini Pesaro during the 2002–03 season. He returned to the United States in 2003 where he played in the NBA Development League during the 2003–04 season for the Roanoke Dazzle and Fayetteville Patriots.

In 2004, Christoffersen returned to his home country of Denmark and joined the Bakken Bears for the 2004–05 season. In 2005–06, he split the season with Bakken and Finnish club Lappeenrannan NMKY.

For the 2006–07 season, Christoffersen played in Sweden for Södertälje BBK. In 2007, he returned to the Bakken Bears, where he played ever since, winning multiple League and Cup titles. Following the 2008–09 Danish League season, Christoffersen ventured to Australia for an off-season stint with the Willetton Tigers of the State Basketball League.

Christoffersen announced that he would retire after the 2018–19 season on 30 May 2019. Christoffersen finished his career as the all-time leader in games played and points for the Bears.
