= Aalborg Vikings =

- Leagues: Danish Basketball League
- Founded: 1958
- Arena: Aalborg Stadionhal
- Location: Aalborg, Denmark
- Team colors
- Website: www.aalborgvikings.dk
Home	Away

Aalborg Vikings is a professional basketball team based in Aalborg, Denmark. The club was founded in 1958 and played in the first division Basketligaen from 2010. In the 2014–15, they relegated from the Basketligaen. They play 1. division and made it to the semifinals in 2018/2019. Head coach of the 2018/2019 and 2019/2020 teams are Tat Tucker, who has signed deals with the Vikings. The goal of the team is to move back up to Basketligaen and represent North Jylland.

== Notable players ==
- (United States) Joe Burton
