= Darko Jukić =

Danish basketball player (born 1990)

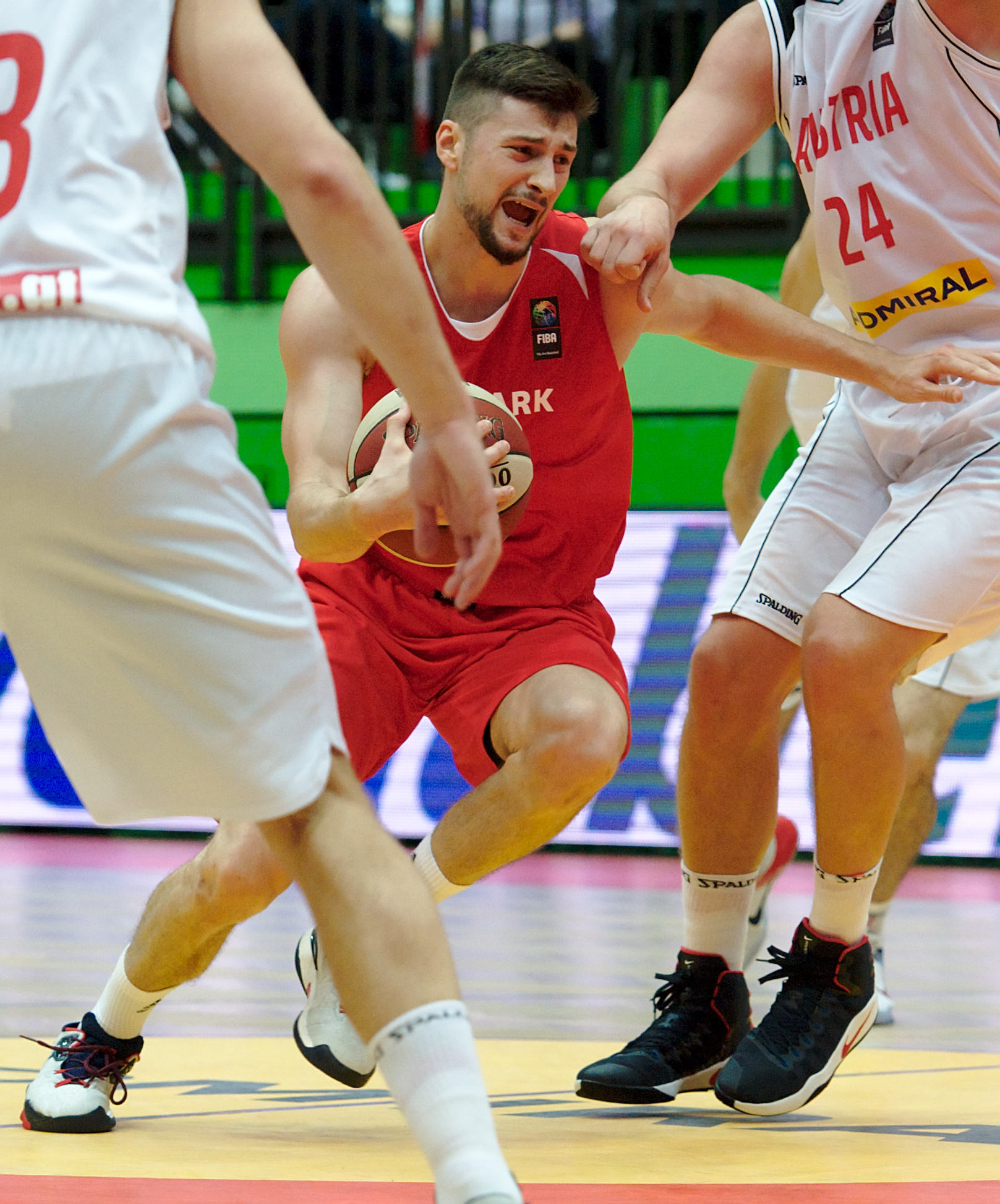

No. 8 – Bakken Bears
- Position: Small forward
- League: Basketligaen

Personal information
- Born: 23 August 1990 (age 36) Copenhagen, Denmark
- Listed height: 6 ft 6 in (1.98 m)
- Listed weight: 207 lb (94 kg)

Career information
- NBA draft: 2012: undrafted
- Playing career: 2008–present

Career history
- 2008–2009: BC Falcon
- 2009–2010: ratiopharm Ulm
- 2010–2012: BC Aarhus
- 2012–2013: Horsens IC
- 2013–2014: Aurora Jesi
- 2014–2015: Södertälje Kings
- 2015–2016: Bakken Bears
- 2016–2017: Krka
- 2017–present: Bakken Bears

Career highlights
- 3× Basketligaen champion (2018–2020); Basketligaen MVP (2013)

Darko Jukić (born 23 August 1990) is a Danish professional basketball player for Bakken Bears of the Basketligaen. He is also a member of the Danish national basketball team. He is a two-time Basketligaen champion and one time Most Valuable Player.

== Professional career ==
On 6 July 2016, Jukić signed a one-year contract with KK Krka of the Slovenian Premier A. After a year in Slovenia, he returned to Bakken Bears.

On 8 July 2019, he extended his contract with the Bears for two more seasons.

== International career ==
Jukić plays for the Danish national team.
