= Bakken Bears =

Danish professional basketball club

Coordinates: 56.1924°N 10.2103°E

- Leagues: Basketligaen; Europe Cup
- Founded: 1954; 72 years ago
- History: Aarhus Basketball Forening; 1954–1962; Skovbakken Basketball; 1962–1999; Bakken Bears; 1999–present
- Arena: Vejlby-Risskov Hallen
- Capacity: 2,050
- Location: Aarhus, Denmark
- Team colors: Navy, Silver, White
- President: Claus Hommelhoff
- Team manager: Michael Piloz
- Head coach: Skyler Bowlin
- Affiliation: Bears Academy
- Championships: 20 Danish Leagues; 12 Danish Cups; 1 ENBL
- Website: bakkenbears.com
| Home | Away |

The Bakken Bears are a Danish professional basketball club based in Aarhus. The club plays in the Basketligaen, the top-tier basketball league in Denmark.

Founded in 1953, the club has won the Basketligaen 20 times, holding the record for the most championships, and has also won 11 Danish Cups. Along with their domestic play, the club is a regular in European competitions. The Bears are a three-time semifinalist of the FIBA Europe Cup.

== History ==
Bears' alternate logo

Bakken Bears was formed in 1953 under the name of Aarhus Basketball Forening, or simply ABF. From 1962, the club was known as Skovbakken Basketball. Bears has been in the top Danish league almost every year since then and won its first title in 1958.. Since then, the club has won a number of domestic titles and is now the most winning sports team in the history of the city of Aarhus.

In the years 2005 to 2009, Bakken Bears was a part of Aarhus Elite A/S, an elite sports organization in Aarhus that includes ia. AGF Football (soccer). In the last months of 2009 a group of local businessmen, sponsors and fans bought the team.

When Bakken Bears hosted Team FOG Næstved in Game 1 of the league semifinals in March 2009, 4,816 spectators watched the game in Aarhus Arena, which set an all-time attendance record for basketball in Denmark.

In the summer of 2018, the Bears' development team EBAA entered the Basketligaen as well.

On 27 March 2018, Bakken Bears qualified for the first time ever for a semifinal of a European competition, by eliminating ESSM Le Portel in the quarterfinals of the FIBA Europe Cup. They then lost the semifinal to Italian S.S. Felice Scandone.

== Players ==
=== Current roster ===
Bakken Bears roster
Players
Coaches

| Pos. | No. | Nat. | Name | Ht. | Wt. | Age |
|---|---|---|---|---|---|---|
| G | 0 | (Denmark) | Ates, Filip | 1.86 m (6 ft 1 in) | | 21 – 28 December 2004 |
| F | 1 | (France) | Binet, Djahi | 2.01 m (6 ft 7 in) | | 26 – 20 October 2000 |
| F | 2 | (Denmark) | Møllgaard, Magnus | 1.96 m (6 ft 5 in) | | 25 – 20 November 2000 |
| G | 3 | (United States) | Mincey, Quinton | 1.96 m (6 ft 5 in) | | 24 – 21 May 2002 |
| G | 4 | (Denmark) | Ziegler, Mads | 1.87 m (6 ft 2 in) | | 19 – 30 January 2007 |
| F | 5 | (United States) | Rancy, Jarnel | 2.03 m (6 ft 8 in) | | 25 – 4 September 2001 |
| SF | 8 | (Denmark) | Jukić, Darko | 1.99 m (6 ft 6 in) | | 36 – 23 August 1990 |
| F | 9 | (Denmark) | Vinther, Marcus | 1.95 m (6 ft 5 in) | | 24 – 15 October 2002 |
| G | 10 | (Denmark) | Jørgensen, Oscar | 1.87 m (6 ft 2 in) | | 27 – 29 December 1998 |
| G | 11 | (United States) | DuBose, Ian | 1.93 m (6 ft 4 in) | | 27 – 16 January 1999 |
| F | 13 | (Denmark) | Berg, Sylvester | 2.01 m (6 ft 7 in) | | 28 – 27 May 1998 |
| F | 15 | (Denmark) | Katholm, Anton | 2.00 m (6 ft 7 in) | | 19 – 11 February 2007 |
| G | 20 | (United States) | Corey, Myles | 1.85 m (6 ft 1 in) | | 25 – 28 April 2001 |
| C | 25 | (Netherlands) | Rombley, Shaquille | 2.03 m (6 ft 8 in) | | 29 – 8 December 1996 |
| F | 99 | (Denmark) | Møller, Carl | 2.03 m (6 ft 8 in) | | 19 – 5 March 2007 |

Head coach

(United States) Skyler Bowlin

Assistant coach(es)

- (Denmark) Thomas Hemmingsen

Legend

- (C) Team captain
- Injured

- Roster
Updated: September 18, 2026

=== Notable players ===
Note: Flags indicate national team eligibility at FIBA-sanctioned events. Players may hold other non-FIBA nationalities not displayed.

Criteria

To appear in this section a player must have either:

- Set a club record or won an individual award while at the club
- Played at least one official international match for their national team at any time
- Played at least one official NBA match at any time.

- (Denmark) Chris Christoffersen
- (Denmark) Tobias Jensen
- (Denmark) Darko Jukic
- (Denmark) Daniel Mortensen
- (Estonia) Kaido Saks
- (Guam) Jonathan Galloway
- (Panama) Tony Bishop
- (United States) Maurice Acker
- (United States) DeVaughn Akoon-Purcell
- (United States) Jeffrey Crockett
- (United States) Ryan Evans
- (United States) Shawn Glover

=== Individual awards ===
Basketligaen MVP

- Eric Bell – 2003
- DeVaughn Akoon-Purcell – 2017
- Ryan Evans – 2019

Basketligaen Finals MVP

- Chris Christoffersen – 2013
- Kenny Barker – 2014
- DeVaughn Akoon-Purcell – 2017
- Jeffrey Crockett – 2018
- Tobin Carberry – 2019
- Michel Diouf – 2021
- Marvelle Harris – 2022

== Honours ==
=== Domestic competitions ===
- Basketligaen
  - Winners (21) : 1957–58, 1996–97, 1998–99, 1999–00, 2000–01, 2003–04, 2004–05, 2006–07, 2007–08, 2008–09, 2010–11, 2011–12, 2012–13, 2013–14, 2016–17, 2017–18, 2018–19, 2019–20, 2020–21, 2021–22, 2022–23
    - Runners-up (8) : 1962–63, 1964–65, 1989–90, 1997–98, 2002–03, 2005–2006, 2009–10, 2014–15
- Danish Cup
  - Winners (13): 1999, 2000, 2003, 2004, 2006, 2008, 2009, 2010, 2011, 2013, 2016, 2018, 2020, 2021, 2023
    - Runners-up (7) : 1980, 1995, 2002, 2005, 2012, 2014, 2022

=== European competitions ===
- FIBA Europe Cup
  - Semi-finalist (3): 2017–18, 2019–20, 2021–22
- European North Basketball League
  - Champions (1): 2024

== Season by season ==
| Season | Tier | League | Pos. | Danish Cup | European competitions | |
|---|---|---|---|---|---|---|
| 2010–11 | 1 | Basketligaen | 1st | Champion | | |
| 2011–12 | 1 | Basketligaen | 1st | Runner-up | | |
| 2012–13 | 1 | Basketligaen | 1st | Champion | | |
| 2013–14 | 1 | Basketligaen | 1st | Runner-up | 3 EuroChallenge | T16 |
| 2014–15 | 1 | Basketligaen | 2nd | Round of 16 | 3 EuroChallenge | RS |
| 2015–16 | 1 | Basketligaen | 2nd | Champion | 3 FIBA Europe Cup | R32 |
| 2016–17 | 1 | Basketligaen | 1st | Semifinalist | 3 Champions League | RS |
| 2017–18 | 1 | Basketligaen | 1st | Champion | 3 Champions League | QR2 |
| 2017–18 | 1 | Basketligaen | 1st | Champion | 4 FIBA Europe Cup | SF |
| 2018–19 | 1 | Basketligaen | 1st | Quarterfinalist | 3 Champions League | QR2 |
| 2018–19 | 1 | Basketligaen | 1st | Quarterfinalist | 4 FIBA Europe Cup | QF |
| 2019–20 | 1 | Basketligaen | 1st | Champion | | |
| 2020–21 | 1 | Basketligaen | 1st | Champion | | |
| 2021–22 | 1 | Basketligaen | 1st | Runner-up | 4 FIBA Europe Cup | SF |
| 2022–23 | 1 | Basketligaen | 1st | Champions | 3 Champions League | L16 |
| 2023–24 | 1 | Basketligaen | 1st | Runner-up | R European North Basketball League | C |
| 2024–25 | 1 | Basketligaen | 1st | Runner-up | R European North Basketball League | QF |
| 2025–26 | 1 | Basketligaen | | Quarterfinalist | 3 Champions League | QR |
| 2025–26 | 1 | Basketligaen | | Quarterfinalist | 4 FIBA Europe Cup | RS |

== Head coaches ==
- (Denmark) Steffen Wich
