= Ryan Evans =

American basketball player (born 1990)

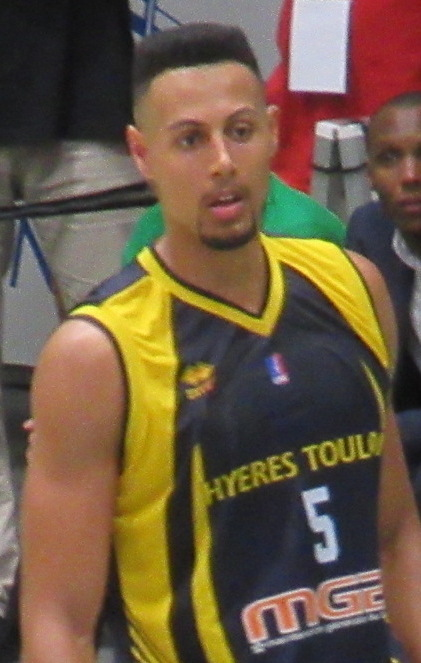

Personal information
- Born: June 19, 1990 (age 36) Chicago, Illinois, U.S.
- Listed height: 6 ft 8 in (2.03 m)
- Listed weight: 218 lb (99 kg)

Career information
- High school: Hamilton (Phoenix, Arizona)
- College: Wisconsin (2009–2013)
- NBA draft: 2013: undrafted
- Playing career: 2013–present
- Position: Small forward
- Number: 5

Career history
- 2013–2014: Sioux Falls Skyforce
- 2014–2015: Atomerőmű SE
- 2015–2016: Saint-Quentin
- 2016–2017: Hyères-Toulon
- 2017–2018: Cholet
- 2018–2024: Bakken Bears

Career highlights
- Basketligaen MVP (2019); Basketligaen Finals MVP (2023); Basketligaen champion (2019, 2020, 2021, 2022, 2023)
- Stats at Basketball Reference

Ryan Evans (born June 19, 1990) is an American professional basketball player who last played for Bakken Bears of Denmark's Basketligaen. Standing at 6 ft 8 in (2.03 m) and weighing 218 lb (99 kg), Evans usually plays at small forward. He played college basketball for the Wisconsin Badgers.

== High school career ==
Evans attended Phoenix Desert Vista High School, but transferred to Hamilton High School as a junior. He averaged 8.5 points and 4.5 rebounds in his junior season. As a senior, Evans was named to the first team all-state and led Hamilton to the state semifinals. He averaged 18.4 points and 7.4 rebounds per game as a senior.

== College career ==
Evans committed to Wisconsin and redshirted his freshman year in 2008–09. As a redshirt freshman in 2009–10, he averaged 3.5 points and 3.0 rebounds in 12.8 minutes per game. Evans scored in double figures in four contests.

Evans posted averages of 2.8 points and 2.3 rebounds per game as a redshirt sophomore in 2010–11. He appeared in all 33 games and played 11.6 minutes per game in a reserve capacity.

He raised his averages to 11.0 points and a Badgers-leading 6.8 rebounds per game as a redshirt junior in 2011–12. Evans scored 14.5 points and grabbed 6.5 rebounds per game in the NCAA tournament in helping the team to the Sweet 16. Evans was an All-Big Ten Honorable Mention.

As a senior in 2012–13, Evans was third on Wisconsin in scoring with 10.1 points per game and led the team in rebounding with 7.3 per game. He was named to the Big Ten All-Tournament team after averaging 11.3 points and 6.0 rebounds per game during the Big Ten tournament. Evans was also named to the Big Ten All-Academic Team He holds the Wisconsin record for career games played at 138.

In 2013, Evans was named Arthur Ashe Jr. Sports Scholar by Diverse: Issues in Higher Education.

== Professional career ==
After going undrafted in 2013, Evans signed with the Sioux Falls Skyforce of the NBA D-League. He averaged 8.3 points and 4.3 rebounds per game in his rookie season in 2013–14. He shot 38.3 percent from the floor and 27.5 percent from 3-point range in 33 games for the Skyforce.

Evans joined the Minnesota Timberwolves in the 2014 summer league. He played for Atomerőmű SE in the Hungarian professional league in 2014–15. He averaged 13.5 points and 6 rebounds per game.

In the 2018–19 season, Evans played with Bakken Bears of the Danish Basketligaen. He was named the Basketligaen MVP after the regular season. Evans also won the Basketligaen title after defeating Horsens IC in the final, 4–0. He averaged 14 points, 6 rebounds and 3 assists during the 2019–20 season. On May 22, 2020, Evans re-signed with Bakken. In 2023, he received Basketligaen Finals MVP honors.

== Honors ==
Bakken Bears

- Basketligaen: 2018–19 2019–20 2020–21 2021–22, 2022–23
- Danish Cup: 2020, 2021, 2023
- Basketligaen MVP: 2018–19
- Basketligaen Finals MVP: 2022–23
