= 2014–15 Basketligaen =

Basketligaen
- Duration: October 8, 2014 – May 15, 2015
- Games played: 27
- Teams: 10

Regular season
- Season MVP: (United States) Skyler Bowlin

Finals
- Champions: Horsens IC; 5th title
- Runners-up: Bakken Bears
- Third place: Team FOG Næstved
- Fourth place: Svendborg Rabbits
- Finals MVP: (Ireland) Brian Fitzpatrick

Statistical leaders
| Points | (United States) Darryl Partin | 27.0 |
| Rebounds | (United States) Bonell Colas | 12.6 |
| Assists | (Argentina) Antonio Porta | 7.1 |

The 2014–15 Basketligaen was the 40th season of the highest professional basketball tier in Denmark.

Horsens IC took the title, by beating Bakken Bears 2–4 in the Finals. Team FOG Næstved beat Svendborg Rabbits 103–104 in the third-place play-off.

== Regular season ==
| Pos | Team | Pld | W | L | PF | PA | PD | Qualification |
|---|---|---|---|---|---|---|---|---|
| 1 | Bakken Bears | 27 | 24 | 3 | 2519 | 2127 | +392 | Championship Playoffs |
| 2 | Horsens IC | 27 | 23 | 4 | 2401 | 2042 | +359 | Championship Playoffs |
| 3 | Svendborg Rabbits | 27 | 18 | 9 | 2303 | 2167 | +136 | Championship Playoffs |
| 4 | Copenhagen Wolfpack | 27 | 16 | 11 | 2409 | 2223 | +186 | Championship Playoffs |
| 5 | Team FOG Næstved | 27 | 13 | 14 | 2133 | 2113 | +20 | Championship Playoffs |
| 6 | Randers Cimbria | 27 | 12 | 15 | 2320 | 2404 | −84 | Championship Playoffs |
| 7 | SISU Copenhagen | 27 | 10 | 17 | 2292 | 2370 | −78 | Championship Playoffs |
| 8 | Horsholm 79ers | 27 | 9 | 18 | 2174 | 2327 | −153 | Championship Playoffs |
| 9 | Værløse | 27 | 7 | 20 | 1996 | 2235 | −239 | Relegation Playoffs |
| 10 | Aalborg Vikings | 27 | 3 | 24 | 2012 | 2551 | −539 | Relegation Playoffs |

=== Rounds 1-18 ===
| Home \ Away | AAL | BAK | COP | HIC | HSH | NAE | RAN | SISU | SVE | VAE |
|---|---|---|---|---|---|---|---|---|---|---|
| Aalborg Vikings | | 97–122 | 69–95 | 71–104 | 63–72 | 73–93 | 77–87 | 107–98 | 75–90 | 62–93 |
| Bakken Bears | 111–52 | | 95–89 | 87–92 | 94–68 | 88–75 | 85–89 | 97–85 | 75–73 | 100–70 |
| Copenhagen Wolfpack | 109–77 | 83–84 | | 70–82 | 92–82 | 71–81 | 93–87 | 94–81 | 110–82 | 101–66 |
| Horsens IC | 84–75 | 77–90 | 88–78 | | 94–64 | 80–70 | 82–77 | 93–68 | 80–78 | 107–78 |
| Horsholm 79ers | 96–80 | 80–123 | 79–95 | 63–76 | | 82–84 | 85–97 | 78–85 | 80–90 | 92–90 |
| Team FOG Næstved | 83–63 | 58–77 | 87–93 | 79–88 | 92–81 | | 84–99 | 75–86 | 82–88 | 68–65 |
| Randers Cimbria | 96–65 | 110–112 | 89–85 | 72–81 | 103–96 | 71–97 | | 104–85 | 92–95 | 76–91 |
| SISU Copenhagen | 114–87 | 74–96 | 95–88 | 86–78 | 97–77 | 82–88 | 123–100 | | 88–98 | 73–66 |
| Svendborg Rabbits | 91–74 | 93–95 | 81–78 | 69–91 | 83–79 | 76–79 | 95–60 | 87–82 | | 78–73 |
| Værløse Basket | 85–75 | 66–90 | 73–84 | 63–91 | 76–69 | 69–73 | 66–74 | 77–84 | 60–86 | |

Legend: Blue = home team win; Yellow = draw; Red = away team win.

=== Rounds 19-27 ===
| Home \ Away | AAL | BAK | COP | HIC | HSH | NAE | RAN | SISU | SVE | VAE |
|---|---|---|---|---|---|---|---|---|---|---|
| Aalborg Vikings | | | 67–90 | | | 61–84 | 90–81 | | | 69–81 |
| Bakken Bears | 90–53 | | 95–83 | | | | | 106–86 | 85–77 | 88–66 |
| Copenhagen Wolfpack | | | | 83–93 | | 95–84 | 99–84 | 76–73 | 86–91 | |
| Horsens IC | 105–82 | 81–86 | | | 108–65 | | | | 79–100 | |
| Horsholm 79ers | 97–72 | 107–69 | 81–84 | | | | | | 76–74 | 95–78 |
| Team FOG Næstved | | 56–65 | | 79–95 | 70–74 | | | 89–70 | | |
| Randers Cimbria | | 87–111 | | 70–108 | 91–84 | 67–76 | | 87–86 | | |
| SISU Copenhagen | 96–102 | | | 68–88 | 67–75 | | | | 81–75 | 79–82 |
| Svendborg Rabbits | 104–74 | | | | | 79–74 | 85–82 | | | 85–77 |
| Værløse Basket | | | 77–105 | 68–76 | | 74–71 | 66–84 | | | |

Legend: Blue = home team win; Yellow = draw; Red = away team win.

== Championship Playoffs ==
Quarterfinals
1 | Bakken Bears | 3
8 | Horsholm 79ers | 0
4 | Copenhagen Wolfpack | 1
5 | Team FOG Næstved | 3
3 | Svendborg Rabbits | 3
6 | Randers Cimbria | 0
2 | Horsens IC | 3
7 | SISU Copenhagen | 0

Semifinals
1 | Bakken Bears | 3
5 | Team FOG Næstved | 1
3 | Svendborg Rabbits | 2
2 | Horsens IC | 3

Finals
1 | Bakken Bears | 2
2 | Horsens IC | 4
Third place
3 | Svendborg Rabbits | 103
5 | Team FOG Næstved | 104

== Relegation Playoffs ==
| Home court advantage | Score | Home court disadvantage |
|---|---|---|
| Værløse | 3–0 | Aalborg Vikings |

== Awards ==
| Awards | Player | Team |
|---|---|---|
| MVP | (United States) Skyler Bowlin | Horsens IC |
| Finals MVP | (Republic of Ireland) Brian Fitzpatrick | Horsens IC |
| Best Coach | (Denmark) Arnel Dedic | Horsens IC |
| Best Defensive Player | (Denmark) Baye Keita | Horsens IC |
| Best Talent | (Denmark) Gabriel Iffe Lundberg | Copenhagen Wolfpack |
