= 2017–18 Basketligaen =

- Season: 2017–18
- Duration: 20 September 2017 – 7 May 2018
- Teams: 8

Regular season
- Top seed: Horsens
- Season MVP: (Denmark) Kevin Larsen

Finals
- Champions: Bakken Bears; 16th title
- Runners-up: Horsens IC
- Third place: Randers Cimbria
- Fourth place: Team FOG Næstved
- Finals MVP: (United States) Jeffrey Crockett

Statistical leaders
Points	(United States) Matt Bonds	22.4
Rebounds	(United States) Durell Vinson	12.8
Assists	(Denmark) Ferederik Nielsen	6.0

The 2017–18 Basketligaen was the 43rd season of the highest professional basketball tier in Denmark. The season started on 20 September 2017 and ended on 7 May 2018. Bakken Bears was the defending champion, and won the championship again after beating Horsens IC in the play-off finals.

== Competition format ==
In the regular season, teams played against each other four times home-and-away in double a round-robin format. The eight teams advanced to the playoffs.

== Teams ==
Location of teams in 2017–18 Basketligaen

Wolfpack returned to the Basketligan after a two-year absence. They replaced SISU, which was the last qualified in the previous season and therefore relegated.

Team	City	Arena
Bakken Bears	Aarhus	Vejlby-Risskov Hallen
Horsens IC	Horsens	Forum Horsens
Hørsholm 79ers	Hørsholm	Fire Arena
Randers Cimbria	Randers	Arena Randers
Stevnsgade SuperMen	Copenhagen	Nørrebrohallen
Svendborg Rabbits	Svendborg	Svendborg Idrætscenter
Team FOG Næstved	Næstved	Næstved Hallen
Wolfpack	Copenhagen	

== Regular season ==
=== Table ===
Pos	Team	Pld	W	L	PF	PA	PD	Pts	Qualification
1	Horsens	21	19	2	1910	1601	+309	38	Qualification to playoffs
2	Bakken Bears	21	17	4	1985	1709	+276	34	Qualification to playoffs
3	Team FOG Næstved	21	13	8	1814	1699	+115	26	Qualification to playoffs
4	Hørsholm 79ers	21	12	9	1881	1734	+147	24	Qualification to playoffs
5	Randers Cimbria	21	9	12	1924	1843	+81	18	Qualification to playoffs
6	Svendborg Rabbits	21	8	13	1723	1839	−116	16	Qualification to playoffs
7	Wolfpack	21	4	17	1548	1966	−418	8	Qualification to playoffs
8	Stevnsgade SuperMen	21	2	19	1620	2014	−394	4	Qualification to playoffs

Source: Basketligaen
Rules for classification: 1) Points; 2) Head-to-head results; 3) Head-to-head points ratio; 4) Total points ratio.

== Playoffs ==
The playoffs were played between the eight teams of the competition, with a best-of-five series in a 1-1-1-1-1 format. The seeded team played games 1, 3 and 5 at home. The Finals will be played in a best-of-seven series and the bronze medal series as a single game. The playoffs began on 13 March and ended 7 May 2018.

=== Bracket ===
Quarterfinals
1 Horsens	3
8 Stevnsgade SuperMen	0
4 Hørsholm 79ers	1
5 Randers Cimbria	3
2 Bakken Bears	3
7 Wolfpack	0
3 Team FOG Næstved	3
6 Svendborg Rabbits	0

Semifinals
1 Horsens	3
5 Randers Cimbria	2
2 Bakken Bears	3
3 Team FOG Næstved	2

Finals
1 Horsens	0
2 Bakken Bears	4
Third place game
3 Team FOG Næstved	99
5 Randers Cimbria	100

=== Quarterfinals ===
The quarter-finals began on 18 March and ended 29 March 2018.

Team 1	Series	Team 2	Game 1	Game 2	Game 3	Game 4	Game 5
Horsens	3–0	Stevnsgade SuperMen	97–69	102–73	123–72		
Hørsholm 79ers	1–3	Randers Cimbria	99–86	80–94	90–98	96–105	
Bakken Bears	3–0	Wolfpack	103–68	98–77	109–106		
Team FOG Næstved	3–0	Svendborg Rabbits	93–78	82–67	96–78		

=== Semifinals ===
Team 1	Series	Team 2	Game 1	Game 2	Game 3	Game 4	Game 5
Horsens	3–2	Randers Cimbria	102–97	81–79	76–93	81–85	77–73
Bakken Bears	3–2	Team FOG Næstved	83–91	74–84	100–84	85–78	74–61

=== Third place game ===
Team 1	Score	Team 2
Team FOG Næstved	99–100	Randers Cimbria

=== Finals ===
Team 1	Series	Team 2	Game 1	Game 2	Game 3	Game 4	Game 5	Game 6	Game 7
Horsens	0–4	Bakken Bears	57–71	77–100	68–79	76–83			

== Clubs in European competitions ==
Team	Competition	Result	Record	Ref
Bakken Bears	Champions League	Second qualifying round	1–1	
Bakken Bears	FIBA Europe Cup	Semi-finals	10–8	
