= 2016–17 Basketligaen =

Basketligaen
- Season: 2016–17
- Teams: 8

Regular season
- Season MVP: (United States) DeVaughn Akoon-Purcell

Finals
- Champions: Bakken Bears (15th title)
- Runners-up: Horsens IC
- Third place: Svendborg Rabbits
- Fourth place: SISU
- Finals MVP: (United States) DeVaughn Akoon-Purcell

Statistical leaders
Points	(United States) DeVaughn Akoon-Purcell	21.4
Rebounds	(United States) Tanner McGrew	10.5
Assists	(Denmark) Frederik Nielsen	6.5
Index Rating	(United States) Tanner McGrew	23.7

The 2016–17 Basketligaen was the 42nd season of the highest professional basketball tier in Denmark. The season started on September 30, 2016 and ended on May 8, 2017. Bakken Bears won its 15th title after defeating Horsens IC 4–1 in the Finals.

== Teams ==
Location of teams in 2016–17 Basketligaen

Team	City	Arena
Bakken Bears	Aarhus	Vejlby-Risskov Hallen
SISU	Gentofte	Kildeskovshallen
Svendborg Rabbits	Svendborg	Svendborg Idrætscenter
Team FOG Næstved	Næstved	Næstved Hallen
Randers Cimbria	Randers	Arena Randers
Hørsholm 79ers	Hørsholm	Fire Arena
Stevnsgade SuperMen	Copenhagen	Nørrebrohallen
Horsens IC	Horsens	Forum Horsens

== Competition format ==
The participating teams first played a round-robin schedule with every team playing each opponent twice home and twice away for a total of 28 games. The top six teams qualified for the championship playoffs whilst the two last qualified were relegated to Division 1.

== Regular season ==
Pos	Team	Pld	W	L	PF	PA	PR	Pts	Qualification
1	Bakken Bears	28	24	4	2683	2179	1.231	48	Qualification to playoffs
2	Horsens	28	23	5	2543	2219	1.146	46	Qualification to playoffs
3	Hørsholm 79ers	28	15	13	2133	2156	0.989	30	Qualification to playoffs
4	Team FOG Næstved	28	13	15	2300	2233	1.030	26	Qualification to playoffs
5	Svendborg Rabbits	28	13	15	2173	2206	0.985	26	Qualification to playoffs
6	SISU	28	12	16	2279	2347	0.971	24	Qualification to playoffs
7	Randers Cimbria	28	10	18	2311	2542	0.909	20	Qualification to playoffs
8	Stevnsgade SuperMen	28	2	26	2004	2544	0.788	4	Qualification to playoffs

Source: Basketligaen
Rules for classification: 1) Points; 2) Head-to-head results; 3) Head-to-head points ratio; 4) Total points ratio.

== Playoffs ==
Playoffs were played between the eight teams of the competition, with a best-of-five series in a 1-1-1-1-1 format. The seeded team played games 1, 3 and 5 at home. The Finals will be played in a best-of-seven series and the bronze medal series as a single game.

Quarter-finals
1 Bakken Bears	117	118	114
8 Stevnsgade SuperMen	60	72	65
4 Team FOG Næstved	67	80	91
5 Svendborg Rabbits	72	85	97
2 Horsens	112	105	88
7 Randers Cimbria	80	82	87
3 Hørsholm 79ers	59	75	74	84	57
6 SISU	68	97	73	82	81

Semi-finals
1 Bakken Bears	95	85	93
5 Svendborg Rabbits	79	70	85
2 Horsens IC	85	66	74	84
6 SISU	93	63	61	77

Final
1 Bakken Bears	90	94	91	93	81
2 Horsens IC	106	76	81	85	73

Third place game
5 Svendborg Rabbits	87
6 SISU	72

== Attendances ==
Attendances include playoff games:

Pos	Team	Total	High	Low	Average	Change
1	Team FOG Næstved	18,693	2,017	501	1,168	−1.4%
2	Horsens IC	17,839	1,567	717	991	−30.7%^{1}
3	Svendborg Rabbits	17,841	1,500	600	1,049	+11.0%
4	Hørsholm 79ers	10,420	1,250	300	613	−1.4%
5	Bakken Bears	22,929	1,941	461	1,092	−20.0%
6	Stevnsgade SuperMen	5,220	475	175	348	−13.6%
7	Randers Cimbria	2,520	327	100	168	+1.2%
8	SISU	7,390	1,200	150	411	+79.5%
	League total	102,852	2,017	0	751	+1.3%

Updated to games played on 8 May 2017
Source: Basketligaen
Notes:
1: Not included the final games at Forum Horsens.
