= 2018–19 Basketligaen =

Basketligaen
- Season: 2018–19
- Duration: 25 September 2018 – 13 May 2019
- Teams: 9

Regular season
- Season MVP: (United States) Ryan Evans

Finals
- Champions: Bakken Bears (17th title)
- Runners-up: Horsens IC
- Third place: Team FOG Næstved
- Fourth place: Randers Cimbria

The 2018–19 Basketligaen was the 44th season of the highest professional basketball tier in Denmark. The season started on 25 September 2018 and ended on 13 May 2019. Bakken Bears defended its title. Ryan Evans of the Bears was named the season's Most Valuable Player.

== Competition format ==
Teams were divided into two groups: Pro A, joined by the best five teams in the previous season, and Pro B, by the rest of the team. Each team would play against each other of their same league four times, while only twice with teams from the other side.

The five teams of Pro A and the best three of Pro B qualified for playoffs.

== Teams ==
Location of teams in 2018–19 Basketligaen

After the end of the season, Hørsholm 79ers resigned to its place in the league. EBAA and Værløse joined the league.

Team	City	Arena	Capacity
Bakken Bears	Aarhus	Vejlby-Risskov Hallen	2,050
BMS Herlev Wolfpack	Copenhagen	Ballerup Super Arena	6,500
EBAA	Aarhus	Vejlby-Risskov Hallen	2,050
Horsens IC	Horsens	Forum Horsens	3,300
Randers Cimbria	Randers	Arena Randers	3,000
Stevnsgade SuperMen	Copenhagen	Nørrebrohallen	600
Svendborg Rabbits	Svendborg	Svendborg Idrætscenter	1,922
Team FOG Næstved	Næstved	Næstved Hallen	3,500
Værløse	Værløse	Søndersøhallen	

== Regular season ==
=== Pro A ===
Pos	Team	Pld	W	L	PF	PA	PD	Pts	Qualification
1	Bakken Bears	24	22	2	2444	1948	+496	44	Qualification to playoffs
2	Horsens	24	18	6	2256	1954	+302	36	Qualification to playoffs
3	Team FOG Næstved	24	14	10	2191	1969	+222	28	Qualification to playoffs
4	Svendborg Rabbits	24	13	11	1979	1979	0	26	Qualification to playoffs
5	Randers Cimbria	24	13	11	2160	2185	−25	26	Qualification to playoffs

Source: Basketligaen

=== Pro B ===
Pos	Team	Pld	W	L	PF	PA	PD	Pts	Qualification
1	EBAA	22	8	14	1668	1847	−179	16	Qualification to playoffs
2	BMS Herlev Wolfpack	22	7	15	1787	2015	−228	14	Qualification to playoffs
3	Værløse	22	7	15	1720	1906	−186	14	Qualification to playoffs
4	Stevnsgade SuperMen	22	2	20	1567	1969	−402	4	

Source: Basketligaen

=== Results ===
Home \ Away	BAK	WOL	HIC	EBA	RAN	SVE	STE	FOG	VAE	BAK	WOL	HIC	EBA	RAN	SVE	STE	FOG	VAE
Bakken Bears	—	109–72	101–78	119–83	109–74	87–78	102–78	109–89	113–74	—	—	110–98	—	108–95	97–78	—	110–86	—
BMS Herlev Wolfpack	80–124	—	76–124	86–99	78–107	66–88	95–83	83–100	95–86	—	—	—	70–72	—	—	97–79	—	84–74
Horsens	94–101	83–54	—	95–64	106–90	105–78	106–70	90–92	85–65	86–75	—	—	—	93–106	102–80	—	80–75	—
EBAA	75–89	56–88	64–82	—	56–82	71–93	78–64	75–87	64–67	—	88–69	—	—	—	—	80–64	—	81–63
Randers Cimbria	107–103	98–91	81–95	101–90	—	76–96	94–69	85–81	114–85	85–115	—	94–103	—	—	82–91	—	85–104	—
Svendborg Rabbits	70–100	90–76	64–106	99–89	69–72	—	81–62	84–75	85–73	78–81	—	75–86	—	73–77	—	—	88–80	—
Stevnsgade SuperMen	57–118	95–97	74–98	79–92	71–88	52–75	—	62–111	60–67	—	73–67	—	78–83	—	—	—	—	71–79
Team FOG Næstved	67–79	108–70	101–84	101–71	103–90	89–94	84–65	—	97–61	88–93	—	70–76	—	113–91	95–74	—	—	—
Værløse	78–90	93–84	94–101	68–64	83–86	80–98	78–63	70–95	—	—	84–109	—	99–73	—	—	88–60	—	—

Source: Basketligaen
Legend: Blue = home team win; Red = away team win.

== Playoffs ==
The playoffs were played between the eight teams of the competition, with a best-of-five series in a 1-1-1-1-1 format. The seeded team played games 1, 3 and 5 at home. The Finals will be played in a best-of-seven series and the bronze medal series as a single game.

=== Bracket ===
Quarterfinals
Bakken Bears	3
Værløse	0
Svendborg Rabbits	2
Randers Cimbria	3
Horsens	3
BMS Herlev Wolfpack	0
Team FOG Næstved	3
EBAA	0

Semifinals
Bakken Bears	3
Randers Cimbria	1
Horsens	3
Team FOG Næstved	0

Finals
Bakken Bears	4
Horsens	0
Third place game
Team FOG Næstved	101
Randers Cimbria	92

=== Quarterfinals ===
Team 1	Series	Team 2	Game 1	Game 2	Game 3	Game 4	Game 5
Bakken Bears	3–0	Værløse	107–81	98–87	90–71		
Horsens	3–0	BMS Herlev Wolfpack	112–67	99–75	91–64		
Team FOG Næstved	3–0	EBAA	89–65	93–64	101–66		
Svendborg Rabbits	2–3	Randers Cimbria	81–65	88–95	74–83	86–82	73–79

=== Semifinals ===
Team 1	Series	Team 2	Game 1	Game 2	Game 3	Game 4	Game 5
Bakken Bears	3–1	Randers Cimbria	95–85	92–99	99–84	92–87	
Horsens	3–0	Team FOG Næstved	89–78	93–81	109–66		

=== Third place game ===
Team 1	Score	Team 2
Team FOG Næstved	101–92	Randers Cimbria

=== Finals ===
Team 1	Series	Team 2	Game 1	Game 2	Game 3	Game 4	Game 5	Game 6	Game 7
Bakken Bears	4–0	Horsens	91–86	83–76	91–62	91–76			

== Danish clubs in European competitions ==
Team	Competition	Result
Bakken Bears	Champions League	Second qualifying round
Bakken Bears	FIBA Europe Cup	Round of 16
