= 2015–16 Basketligaen =

Basketligaen
- Duration: 3 October 2015 – 9 May 2016
- Teams: 8

Regular season
- Top seed: Horsens
- Season MVP: (United States) Brandon Rozzell

Finals
- Champions: Horsens IC; 6th title
- Runners-up: Bakken Bears
- Third place: Team FOG Næstved
- Fourth place: Hørsholm 79ers
- Finals MVP: (United States) Nimrod Hilliard

Statistical leaders
| Points | (United States) Brandon Rozzell | 25.2 |
| Rebounds | (United States) Evan Yates | 9.2 |
| Assists | (United States) David Smedley | 5.7 |

The 2015–16 Basketligaen was the 41st season of the highest professional basketball tier in Denmark. The season started on October 3, 2015 and ended on May 9, 2016. Horsens IC won the Danish championship for the second year in a row, after it defeated Bakken Bears in the Finals.

== Competition format ==
The participating teams first played a round-robin schedule with every team playing each opponent twice home and twice away for a total of 28 games. The top six teams qualified for the championship playoffs whilst the two last qualified were relegated to Division 1.

== Regular season ==
| Pos | Team | Pld | W | L | PF | PA | PD | Pts | Qualification |
|---|---|---|---|---|---|---|---|---|---|
| 1 | Horsens | 28 | 25 | 3 | 2445 | 2009 | +436 | 53 | Qualification to playoff semi-finals |
| 2 | Bakken Bears | 28 | 23 | 5 | 2918 | 2246 | +672 | 51 | Qualification to playoff quarter-finals |
| 3 | Team FOG Næstved | 28 | 17 | 11 | 2583 | 2347 | +236 | 45 | Qualification to playoff quarter-finals |
| 4 | Svendborg Rabbits | 28 | 16 | 12 | 2721 | 2685 | +36 | 44 | Qualification to playoff quarter-finals |
| 5 | Hørsholm 79ers | 28 | 13 | 15 | 2489 | 2550 | −61 | 41 | Qualification to playoff quarter-finals |
| 6 | Randers Cimbria | 28 | 8 | 20 | 2473 | 2934 | −461 | 36 | Qualification to playoff quarter-finals |
| 7 | Stevnsgade SuperMen | 28 | 5 | 23 | 2275 | 2779 | −504 | 33 | Qualification to playoff quarter-finals |
| 8 | SISU Copenhagen | 28 | 5 | 23 | 2187 | 2541 | −354 | 33 | |

Source: Basketligaen

== Playoffs ==
Quarterfinals
4 | Svendborg Rabbits | 1
5 | Hørsholm 79ers | 3
2 | Bakken Bears | 3
7 | Stevnsgade SuperMen | 0
3 | Team FOG Næstved | 3
6 | Randers Cimbria | 0

Semifinals
1 | Horsens | 3
5 | Hørsholm 79ers | 0
2 | Bakken Bears | 3
3 | Team FOG Næstved | 0

Finals
1 | Horsens | 4
2 | Bakken Bears | 3

| Third place |
| 3 | Team FOG Næstved | 81 |
| 5 | Hørsholm 79ers | 70 |

== Awards ==
Nimrod Hilliard of Horsens was named the 2016 Finals MVP. Brandon Rozzell of Svendborg Rabbits was named the 2015–16 Regular Season MVP.

== Attendances ==
Attendances include playoff games:

| Pos | Team | Total | High | Low | Average | Change |
|---|---|---|---|---|---|---|
| 1 | Horsens | 28,586 | 3,388 | 612 | 1,429 | +18.8% |
| 2 | Bakken Bears | 28,658 | 5,812 | 489 | 1,365 | −8.6% |
| 3 | Team FOG Næstved | 21,330 | 2,642 | 657 | 1,185 | +33.9% |
| 4 | Svendborg Rabbits | 15,117 | 1,381 | 425 | 945 | +7.5% |
| 5 | Hørsholm 79ers | 10,575 | 1,164 | 374 | 622 | −18.3% |
| 6 | Stevnsgade SuperMen | 6,052 | 560 | 245 | 403 | n/a |
| 7 | SISU Copenhagen | 3,205 | 600 | 75 | 229 | +11.2% |
| 8 | Randers Cimbria | 2,489 | 375 | 80 | 166 | −36.2% |
| | League total | 116,012 | 5,812 | 75 | 859 | +15.9% |

Updated to games played on the end of the season
Source: Basketligaen
