= EuroBasket Women 2021 qualification =

This page describes the qualification procedure for FIBA Women's EuroBasket 2021. 14 teams joined the co-hosts France and Spain.

== Qualifying draw ==
The draw took place on 22 July 2019 in Munich, Germany.

Pot 1 Team Belgium Great Britain Hungary Italy Latvia Russia Serbia Slovenia Sweden	Pot 2 Team Belarus Bosnia and Herzegovina Croatia Czech Republic Greece Montenegro Slovakia Turkey Ukraine	Pot 3 Team Germany Iceland Israel Lithuania Netherlands Poland Portugal Romania Switzerland	Pot 4 Team Albania Bulgaria Denmark Estonia Finland North Macedonia

== Groups ==
The top team from each one of the nine groups, as well as the five best-finishing second-placed teams, qualified.

Due to the COVID-19 pandemic, each group played the November 2020 games at a single venue. The same was done for the February 2021 games.

All times are local.

=== Group A ===
Pos	Team	Pld	W	L	PF	PA	PD	Pts	Qualification
1	Slovenia	6	6	0	480	381	+99	12	Final tournament
2	Greece	6	4	2	464	380	+84	10	Final tournament
3	Bulgaria	6	2	4	409	411	−2	8	
4	Iceland	6	0	6	351	532	−181	6	

Source: FIBA
Rules for classification: 1) Points; 2) Head-to-head; 3) Points difference; 4) Points scored.

14 November 2019	Slovenia	70–64	Greece	Celje
20:10	Scoring by quarter: 18–19, 18–11, 18–14, 16–20
	Pts: Oblak 19; Rebs: Jakovina 7 Asts: Oblak 6	Boxscore	Pts: Spanou 18; Rebs: Pavlopoulou 8 Asts: Pavlopoulou 8	Arena: Gimnazija Celje - Center; Referees: Oskars Lucis (LAT), Carsten Straube (GER), Alexandra Stan (ROU)

14 November 2019	Iceland	69–84	Bulgaria	Reykjavík
20:00	Scoring by quarter: 15–19, 13–21, 24–24, 17–20
	Pts: Kjartansdóttir 15; Rebs: Kjartansdóttir 13; Asts: H. Sverrisdóttir 8	Boxscore	Pts: H. Ivanova 25; Rebs: Georgieva, H. Ivanova 8 Asts: Kocheva, Stoycheva 7	Arena: Laugardalshöll; Referees: Thomas Bissuel (FRA), Ville Selkee (FIN), Valentin Oliot (FRA)

17 November 2019	Greece	89–54	Iceland	Chalcis
17:00	Scoring by quarter: 28–12, 26–6, 20–17, 15–19
	Pts: Gemelos 18; Rebs: Bosgana, Chatzileonti 6 Asts: Pavlopoulou 9	Boxscore	Pts: H. Sverrisdóttir 12; Rebs: H. Sverrisdóttir 9 Asts: Jónsdóttir 7	Arena: Tasos Kampouris Indoor Hall; Referees: Andrei Sharapa (BLR), Ivana Radinović (MNE), Natalie Galuk (ISR)

17 November 2019	Bulgaria	64–72	Slovenia	Sofia
18:00	Scoring by quarter: 22–12, 12–19, 10–20, 20–21
	Pts: Georgieva 17; Rebs: Georgieva 10; Asts: Stoycheva 6	Boxscore	Pts: Oblak 19; Rebs: Jakovina 9 Asts: Barič 6	Arena: Universiada Hall; Referees: Mehmet Karabilecen (TUR), Steven Bittner (GER), Alexandra Deman (FRA)

12 November 2020	Iceland	58–94	Slovenia	Heraklion, Greece
17:00	Scoring by quarter: 17–30, 14–28, 17–19, 10–17
	Pts: Rún Hinriksdóttir 23; Rebs: Rún Hinriksdóttir 7 Asts: Rún Hinriksdóttir, Sverrisdóttir 3	Boxscore	Pts: Prezelj 23; Rebs: Lisec 15; Asts: Oblak 6	Arena: Heraklion Indoor Sports Arena; Referees: Ciprian Stoica (ROU), Maxime Boubert (FRA), Nir Meirson (ISR)

12 November 2020	Greece	73–66	Bulgaria	Heraklion
20:00	Scoring by quarter: 21–12, 11–14, 16–22, 25–18
	Pts: Fasoula 21; Rebs: Fasoula 11; Asts: Nikolopoulou 9	Boxscore	Pts: Georgieva 15; Rebs: Zlatanova 13; Asts: Stoycheva 8	Arena: Heraklion Indoor Sports Arena; Referees: Özlem Yalman (TUR), Semen Ovinov (RUS), Nikola Perlić (CRO)

14 November 2020	Bulgaria	74–53	Iceland	Heraklion, Greece
17:00	Scoring by quarter: 21–7, 23–14, 16–17, 14–15
	Pts: Hristova 25; Rebs: Zlatanova 15; Asts: Hristova 6	Boxscore	Pts: Hinriksdóttir 31; Rebs: Hinriksdóttir 8 Asts: Hinriksdóttir, Jónsdóttir 3	Arena: Heraklion Indoor Sports Arena; Referees: Nikola Perlić (CRO), Cecília Tóth (HUN), Nir Meisron (ISR)

14 November 2020	Greece	70–77	Slovenia	Heraklion
20:00	Scoring by quarter: 20–28, 16–10, 18–26, 16–13
	Pts: Stamolamprou 22; Rebs: Spanou 12; Asts: Nikolopoulou, Spanou 3	Boxscore	Pts: Evans 22; Rebs: Senicar 10; Asts: Senicar 5	Arena: Heraklion Indoor Sports Arena; Referees: Özlem Yalman (TUR), Ciprian Stoica (ROU), Semen Ovinov (RUS)

4 February 2021	Slovenia	71–66	Bulgaria	Ljubljana
16:15	Scoring by quarter: 20–18, 21–14, 14–19, 16–15
	Pts: Lisec 23; Rebs: Lisec 7 Asts: Barič 8	Boxscore	Pts: Hristova 20; Rebs: Zlatanova 10; Asts: H. Ivanova 5	Arena: Arena Stožice; Referees: Paulo Marques (POR), Andrada Csender (ROU), Marek Kúkelčík (SVK)

4 February 2021	Iceland	58–95	Greece	Ljubljana, Slovenia
19:15	Scoring by quarter: 17–22, 14–21, 17–28, 10–24
	Pts: Hinriksdóttir 17; Rebs: Kjartansdóttir 9 Asts: Hinriksdóttir, Jónsdóttir 5	Boxscore	Pts: Spyridopoulou 18; Rebs: Fasoula 7 Asts: seven players 3	Arena: Arena Stožice; Referees: Michał Proc (POL), Andrei Sharapa (BLR), Mihkel Männiste (EST)

6 February 2021	Slovenia	96–59	Iceland	Ljubljana
17:00	Scoring by quarter: 24–10, 20–15, 24–20, 28–14
	Pts: Lisec 20; Rebs: Friškovec 10; Asts: Friškovec 8	Boxscore	Pts: Kjartansdóttir 25; Rebs: Kjartansdóttir 9 Asts: Jónsdóttir 8	Arena: Arena Stožice; Referees: Andrada Csender (ROU), Alexandra Stan (ROU), Marek Kúkelčík (SVK)

6 February 2021	Bulgaria	55–73	Greece	Ljubljana, Slovenia
20:00	Scoring by quarter: 11–20, 22–17, 9–15, 13–21
	Pts: H. Ivanova 13; Rebs: H. Ivanova 11; Asts: Stoycheva 4	Boxscore	Pts: Fasoula 16; Rebs: Fasoula, Nikolopoulou 9 Asts: Nikolopoulou 7	Arena: Arena Stožice; Referees: Paulo Marques (POR), Michał Proc (POL), Andrei Sharapa (BLR)

=== Group B ===
Pos	Team	Pld	W	L	PF	PA	PD	Pts	Qualification
1	Sweden	4	3	1	302	215	+87	7 (Note: Sweden 135–124 Montenegro)	Final tournament
2	Montenegro	4	3	1	275	253	+22	7	Final tournament
3	Israel	4	0	4	209	318	−109	4	

Source: FIBA
Rules for classification: 1) Points; 2) Head-to-head; 3) Points difference; 4) Points scored.
Notes:

14 November 2019	Israel	40–77	Sweden	Tel Aviv
19:00	Scoring by quarter: 6–23, 12–15, 15–19, 7–20
	Pts: Raber 10; Rebs: Cohen 6 Asts: Yizchaki 3	Boxscore	Pts: Halvarsson 15; Rebs: Magarity 13; Asts: F. Eldebrink 5	Arena: Drive in Arena; Referees: Maka Kupatadze (GEO), Saša Maričić (SRB), Maria Ignatiou (CYP)

17 November 2019	Sweden	68–55	Montenegro	Malmö
15:00	Scoring by quarter: 23–13, 20–11, 10–13, 15–18
	Pts: E. Eldebrink 16; Rebs: Magarity 8 Asts: E. Eldebrink 7	Boxscore	Pts: Mujović 17; Rebs: Jovanović 8 Asts: Jovanović, Mujović 3	Arena: Malmö Isstadion; Referees: Tanel Suslov (EST), Alexey Davydov (RUS), Carsten Straube (GER)

12 November 2020	Montenegro	73–66	Israel	Heraklion, Greece
14:00	Scoring by quarter: 21–14, 18–21, 16–19, 18–12
	Pts: Jovanović 23; Rebs: Gatling, Jovanović 10; Asts: Jovanović 5	Boxscore	Pts: Cohen 21; Rebs: Cohen 10; Asts: Eisner 8	Arena: Heraklion Indoor Sports Arena; Referees: Charalampos Karakatsounis (GRE), Sergei Beliakov (RUS), Stylianos Simeonidis (GRE)

14 November 2020	Sweden	90–51	Israel	Heraklion, Greece
14:00	Scoring by quarter: 22–13, 30–12, 18–8, 20–18
	Pts: F. Eldebrink 28; Rebs: Drammeh 8 Asts: E. Eldebrink, Lundquist 4	Boxscore	Pts: Raber, Rotberg 15; Rebs: Eisner 5 Asts: Karsh 5	Arena: Heraklion Indoor Sports Arena; Referees: Charalampos Karakatsounis (GRE), Sergei Beliakov (RUS), Maxime Boubert (FRA)

4 February 2021	Montenegro	69–67	Sweden	Podgorica
17:40	Scoring by quarter: 16–22, 16–8, 18–19, 19–18
	Pts: Dubljević 34; Rebs: Dubljević 14; Asts: Dubljević 5	Boxscore	Pts: F. Eldebrink 26; Rebs: F. Eldebrink 8 Asts: E. Eldebrink 5	Arena: Bemax Arena; Referees: Dariusz Zapolski (POL), Carsten Straube (GER), Beniamino Manuel Attard (ITA)

6 February 2021	Israel	52–78	Montenegro	Podgorica, Montenegro
19:00	Scoring by quarter: 9–23, 16–15, 12–22, 15–18
	Pts: Rotberg 22; Rebs: Orbach, Kesten Raz 5 Asts: Karsh 3	Boxscore	Pts: Jovanović 16; Rebs: Dubljević 8 Asts: Mujović 8	Arena: Bemax Arena; Referees: Dariusz Zapolski (POL), Carsten Straube (GER), Alexandre Deman (FRA)

=== Group C ===
Pos	Team	Pld	W	L	PF	PA	PD	Pts	Qualification
1	Russia	6	5	1	517	328	+189	11 (Note: Russia 141–138 Bosnia and Herzegovina)	Final tournament
2	Bosnia and Herzegovina	6	5	1	455	370	+85	11	Final tournament
3	Switzerland	6	2	4	348	471	−123	8	
4	Estonia	6	0	6	330	481	−151	6	

Source: FIBA
Rules for classification: 1) Points; 2) Head-to-head; 3) Points difference; 4) Points scored.
Notes:

14 November 2019	Russia	69–70	Bosnia and Herzegovina	Orenburg
20:00	Scoring by quarter: 14–19, 23–11, 15–19, 17–21
	Pts: Vadeeva 18; Rebs: Vadeeva 11; Asts: Zhedik 5	Boxscore	Pts: Jones 29; Rebs: Jones 16; Asts: Deura 4	Arena: Orenburzhje Sport Hall; Referees: Martin Horozov (BUL), Paulina Gajdosz (POL), Gatis Saliņš (LAT)

14 November 2019	Switzerland	73–63	Estonia	Fribourg
20:00	Scoring by quarter: 20–15, 20–16, 18–17, 15–15
	Pts: Giroud 14; Rebs: Kohler, Rol 8 Asts: Herminjard 5	Boxscore	Pts: Anderson 21; Rebs: Bratka, Köster 7 Asts: Anderson 4	Arena: Site Sportif Saint-Léonard; Referees: Silvia Marziali (ITA), Sinem Tetik (TUR), Nataša Dragojević (MNE)

17 November 2019	Estonia	66–96	Russia	Tallinn
18:30	Scoring by quarter: 15–30, 18–18, 20–25, 13–23
	Pts: Lass 15; Rebs: Bratka 7 Asts: Anderson, Asi 4	Boxscore	Pts: Vadeeva 17; Rebs: Vadeeva 9 Asts: Levchenko 9	Arena: TalTech Sports Hall; Referees: Vladimir Jevtović (SRB), Andrada Csender (ROU), Veronika Vávrová (CZE)

17 November 2019	Bosnia and Herzegovina	80–61	Switzerland	Sarajevo
20:00	Scoring by quarter: 21–11, 27–18, 24–22, 8–10
	Pts: Jones 26; Rebs: Gajić 18; Asts: Deura 5	Boxscore	Pts: Rol 17; Rebs: Giroud 5 Asts: Herminjard 4	Arena: Skenderija; Referees: Özge Şentürk (TUR), Diana Lapanović (SLO), Mehmet Şahin (TUR)

12 November 2020	Switzerland	42–98	Russia	Sarajevo, Bosnia and Herzegovina
17:00	Scoring by quarter: 8–29, 2–24, 14–29, 18–16
	Pts: Herminjard 12; Rebs: Chardon, Ruga 6 Asts: Simioni 2	Boxscore	Pts: Vadeeva 16; Rebs: Musina, Vadeeva 8 Asts: Levchenko 7	Arena: Sports Hall Hills; Referees: Gellért Kapitány (HUN), Özge Şentürk (TUR), Gilbert Hoxha (ALB)

12 November 2020	Bosnia and Herzegovina	92–54	Estonia	Sarajevo
20:00	Scoring by quarter: 32–18, 27–11, 18–14, 15–11
	Pts: Gajić 21; Rebs: Gajić 19; Asts: Jones, Tavić 5	Boxscore	Pts: Pulk 15; Rebs: Pokk 8 Asts: Anderson, Pokk 2	Arena: Sports Hall Hills; Referees: Nikolaos Somos (GRE), Ali Şakacı (TUR), Rune Larsen (DEN)

14 November 2020	Estonia	60–63	Switzerland	Sarajevo, Bosnia and Herzegovina
17:00	Scoring by quarter: 6–9, 24–14, 17–20, 13–20
	Pts: Sepp 13; Rebs: Mesila-Kaarmann, Pokk 9 Asts: three players 3	Boxscore	Pts: Kohler 20; Rebs: Franchina, Kohler 6 Asts: Herminjard 8	Arena: Sports Hall Hills; Referees: Özge Şentürk (TUR), Rune Larsen (DEN), Ali Şakacı (TUR)

14 November 2020	Bosnia and Herzegovina	68–72	Russia	Sarajevo
20:00	Scoring by quarter: 22–20, 18–14, 17–26, 11–12
	Pts: Jones 23; Rebs: Gajić 18; Asts: Deura 7	Boxscore	Pts: Musina 25; Rebs: Musina, Vadeeva 7 Asts: Levchenko 8	Arena: Sports Hall Hills; Referees: Nikolaos Somos (GRE), Gellért Kapitány (HUN), Mehmet Karabilecen (TUR)

4 February 2021	Switzerland	62–67	Bosnia and Herzegovina	Orenburg, Russia
16:30	Scoring by quarter: 14–13, 18–16, 16–19, 14–19
	Pts: Herminjard 23; Rebs: Chardon, Herminjard 5 Asts: Fora 5	Boxscore	Pts: Hurt 30; Rebs: Hurt 13; Asts: Deura 5	Arena: Orenburzhje Sport Hall; Referees: Özlem Yalman (TUR), Gintaras Vitkauskas (LTU), Kerem Baki (TUR)

4 February 2021	Russia	79–35	Estonia	Orenburg
19:30	Scoring by quarter: 23–11, 22–7, 24–10, 10–7
	Pts: Musina 17; Rebs: Vadeeva 11; Asts: Goldyreva, Komarova 6	Boxscore	Pts: Lass 17; Rebs: Pokk 6 Asts: Pulk 2	Arena: Orenburzhje Sport Hall; Referees: Viola Györgyi (NOR), Ventsislav Velikov (BUL), Lizaveta Famina (BLR)

6 February 2021	Estonia	52–78	Bosnia and Herzegovina	Orenburg, Russia
16:30	Scoring by quarter: 11–17, 12–20, 14–20, 15–21
	Pts: Pulk 12; Rebs: Pokk 6 Asts: Oinitš 3	Boxscore	Pts: Brčaninović 23; Rebs: Brčaninović 16; Asts: Deura 6	Arena: Orenburzhje Sport Hall; Referees: Pavel Fuska (SVK), Viola Györgyi (NOR), Gintaras Vitkauskas (LTU)

6 February 2021	Russia	103–47	Switzerland	Orenburg
19:30	Scoring by quarter: 27–14, 22–9, 30–8, 24–16
	Pts: Vadeeva 25; Rebs: Vadeeva 11; Asts: Goldyreva, Kurilchuk 6	Boxscore	Pts: Chardon 11; Rebs: Herminjard 7 Asts: Herminjard 6	Arena: Orenburzhje Sport Hall; Referees: Özlem Yalman (TUR), Ventsislav Velikov (BUL), Kerem Baki (TUR)

=== Group D ===
Pos	Team	Pld	W	L	PF	PA	PD	Pts	Qualification
1	Czech Republic	6	5	1	453	359	+94	11 (Note: Czech Republic 125–121 Italy)	Final tournament
2	Italy	6	5	1	475	386	+89	11	Final tournament
3	Denmark	6	1	5	400	495	−95	7 (Note: Denmark 146–144 Romania)	
4	Romania	6	1	5	389	477	−88	7	

Source: FIBA
Rules for classification: 1) Points; 2) Head-to-head; 3) Points difference; 4) Points scored.
Notes:

14 November 2019	Romania	70–55	Denmark	Timișoara
18:00	Scoring by quarter: 26–14, 13–15, 19–15, 12–11
	Pts: Walker 16; Rebs: Walker 12; Asts: Părău, Walker 6	Boxscore	Pts: Jespersen 18; Rebs: Jespersen 9 Asts: Seilund 3	Arena: Constantin Jude Sports Hall; Referees: Vladimir Jevtović (SRB), Jelena Smiljanić (SRB), Özge Şentürk (TUR)

14 November 2019	Italy	52–62	Czech Republic	Cagliari
20:30	Scoring by quarter: 19–16, 10–17, 12–11, 11–18
	Pts: Zandalasini 16; Rebs: Keys 10; Asts: Dotto, Sottana 5	Boxscore	Pts: Reisingerová 15; Rebs: three players 6 Asts: Elhotová 7	Arena: PalaPirastu; Referees: Jasmina Juras (SRB), Jelena Tomić (CRO), Boris Krejić (SLO)

17 November 2019	Denmark	72–82	Italy	Gentofte
15:30	Scoring by quarter: 18–24, 20–23, 13–17, 21–18
	Pts: Tryggedsson 18; Rebs: Hesseldal 11; Asts: Jespersen 5	Boxscore	Pts: Zandalasini 22; Rebs: Dotto 8 Asts: Dotto 8	Arena: Gentofte Sportspark; Referees: Marek Kúkelčík (SVK), Ville Selkee (FIN), Emma Perry (IRL)

17 November 2019	Czech Republic	60–59	Romania	Prague
18:00	Scoring by quarter: 24–17, 11–14, 7–13, 18–15
	Pts: Elhotová 23; Rebs: Hejdová 8 Asts: Hejdová 5	Boxscore	Pts: Părău 21; Rebs: Walker 13; Asts: Părău 5	Arena: Královka Arena; Referees: Mila Čavara (BIH), Ivana Ivanović (SRB), Gintaras Mačiulis (LTU)

13 November 2020	Czech Republic	84–64	Denmark	Riga, Latvia
16:30	Scoring by quarter: 26–23, 20–18, 18–11, 20–12
	Pts: Elhotová 21; Rebs: Březinová 8 Asts: Bartáková 11	Boxscore	Pts: Jespersen 18; Rebs: Emsbo 6 Asts: Seilund 6	Arena: Olympic Sports Centre; Referees: Marek Maliszewski (POL), Ilya Putenko (RUS), Amel Dahra (FRA)

13 November 2020	Romania	68–90	Italy	Riga, Latvia
19:45	Scoring by quarter: 15–27, 16–24, 17–12, 20–27
	Pts: Mărginean 17; Rebs: Pavel 11; Asts: Ghizila, Părău 5	Boxscore	Pts: Zandalasini 18; Rebs: Andrè 6 Asts: Romeo, Zandalasini 8	Arena: Olympic Sports Centre; Referees: Alfred Jovović (CRO), Goran Šljivić (AUT), Valentin Oliot (FRA)

15 November 2020	Denmark	91–74	Romania	Riga, Latvia
16:30	Scoring by quarter: 19–27, 18–17, 31–14, 23–16
	Pts: Jespersen 35; Rebs: Hesseldal 9 Asts: Ryder 9	Boxscore	Pts: Părău 19; Rebs: Orban 6 Asts: Ghizila 4	Arena: Olympic Sports Centre; Referees: Goran Šljivić (AUT), Ilya Putenko (RUS), Amel Dahra (FRA)

15 November 2020	Czech Republic	63–69	Italy	Riga, Latvia
19:45	Scoring by quarter: 19–16, 13–19, 15–15, 16–19
	Pts: Elhotová 25; Rebs: Březinová 11; Asts: Bartáková 6	Boxscore	Pts: Attura 20; Rebs: Bestagno 6 Asts: Zandalasini 5	Arena: Olympic Sports Centre; Referees: Alfred Jovović (CRO), Elena Chernova (RUS), Mehmet Şahin (TUR)

4 February 2021	Romania	52–100	Czech Republic	Istanbul, Turkey
15:00	Scoring by quarter: 8–32, 17–26, 16–18, 11–24
	Pts: Mărginean 14; Rebs: Orban, Walker 7 Asts: three players 3	Boxscore	Pts: Reisingerová 25; Rebs: Voráčková 10; Asts: Bartáková 16	Arena: Ahmet Cömert Sport Hall; Referees: Geert Jacobs (BEL), Esperanza Mendoza Holgado (ESP), Siniša Prpa (SRB)

4 February 2021	Italy	101–55	Denmark	Istanbul, Turkey
21:00	Scoring by quarter: 26–13, 23–11, 23–19, 29–12
	Pts: Bestagno 18; Rebs: Keys 6 Asts: Zandalasini 6	Boxscore	Pts: Jespersen, Ryder 17; Rebs: Jespersen 6 Asts: Ryder 5	Arena: Ahmet Cömert Sport Hall; Referees: Mehmet Karabilecen (TUR), Jelena Tomić (CRO), Gvidas Gedvilas (LTU)

6 February 2021	Denmark	63–84	Czech Republic	Istanbul, Turkey
15:00	Scoring by quarter: 19–15, 13–28, 17–19, 14–22
	Pts: S. Tryggedsson 12; Rebs: Jespersen 9 Asts: five players 3	Boxscore	Pts: Reisingerová, Záplatová 15; Rebs: Voráčková 8 Asts: Bartáková 7	Arena: Ahmet Cömert Sport Hall; Referees: Jelena Tomić (CRO), Mehmet Karabilecen (TUR), Ivana Ivanović (SRB)

6 February 2021	Italy	81–66	Romania	Istanbul, Turkey
21:00	Scoring by quarter: 15–14, 25–21, 23–16, 18–15
	Pts: Pan 17; Rebs: Bestagno, Carangelo 5 Asts: Romeo 5	Boxscore	Pts: Mărginean 16; Rebs: Şipoş 8 Asts: Şipoş, Walker 4	Arena: Ahmet Cömert Sport Hall; Referees: Gvidas Gedvilas (LTU), Esperanza Mendoza Holgado (ESP), Jelena Tomić (CRO)

=== Group E ===
Pos	Team	Pld	W	L	PF	PA	PD	Pts	Qualification
1	Serbia	4	4	0	320	264	+56	8	Final tournament
2	Turkey	4	2	2	273	248	+25	6	Final tournament
3	Lithuania	4	0	4	238	319	−81	4	
4	Albania (Note: Albania forfeited the games against Lithuania and Serbia and was subsequently disqualified. Their results are void.)	0	0	0	0	0	0	0	Disqualified

Source: FIBA
Rules for classification: 1) Points; 2) Head-to-head; 3) Points difference; 4) Points scored.
Notes:

14 November 2019	Serbia	59–56	Turkey	Belgrade
17:00	Scoring by quarter: 13–15, 14–10, 17–14, 15–17
	Pts: Milić 17; Rebs: Crvendakić, Jovanović 6 Asts: Dabović 4	Boxscore	Pts: Hollingsworth 17; Rebs: Hollingsworth 7 Asts: Yavuz 5	Arena: Ranko Žeravica Sports Hall; Referees: Andris Aunkrogers (LAT), Alexey Davydov (RUS), Kristaps Konstantinovs (LAT)

17 November 2019	Turkey	74–51	Lithuania	Yenişehir
17:30	Scoring by quarter: 21–17, 17–14, 22–13, 14–7
	Pts: Hollingsworth 14; Rebs: Canıtez 8 Asts: Yavuz 6	Boxscore	Pts: Juškaitė 13; Rebs: Miškinienė 7 Asts: Baltkojienė 4	Arena: Servet Tazegül Arena; Referees: Janusz Calik (POL), Zdenko Tomašovič (SVK), Blaž Zupančič (SLO)

12 November 2020	Lithuania	71–82	Serbia	Istanbul, Turkey
15:00	Scoring by quarter: 14–14, 13–25, 22–27, 22–16
	Pts: Juškaitė, Meškonytė 15; Rebs: Miškinienė 10; Asts: Šulskė 5	Boxscore	Pts: Crvendakić 19; Rebs: Vasić 6 Asts: Anderson 7	Arena: Ahmet Cömert Sport Hall; Referees: Petr Hrůša (CZE), Ivor Matějek (CZE), Alexandra Stan (ROU)

14 November 2020	Turkey	76–83(OT)	Serbia	Istanbul
18:00	Scoring by quarter: 15–18, 19–20, 19–15, 10–10, Overtime: 10–10, 3–10
	Pts: Alben 17; Rebs: Yildizhan 8 Asts: Yavuz 7	Boxscore	Pts: Anderson 25; Rebs: Crvendakić 12; Asts: Anderson 6	Arena: Ahmet Cömert Sport Hall; Referees: Petr Hrůša (CZE), Ivor Matějek (CZE), Alin Faur (ROU)

4 February 2021	Lithuania	55–67	Turkey	Istanbul, Turkey
18:00	Scoring by quarter: 9–19, 20–14, 7–21, 19–13
	Pts: Nacickaitė 17; Rebs: Labuckienė 9 Asts: Jocytė 4	Boxscore	Pts: Bilgiç 12; Rebs: Ural 9 Asts: Canıtez 6	Arena: Ahmet Cömert Sport Hall; Referees: Sergei Beliakov (RUS), Steve Bittner (GER), Thomas Bissuel (FRA)

6 February 2021	Serbia	96–61	Lithuania	Istanbul, Turkey
18:00	Scoring by quarter: 26–18, 34–15, 22–11, 14–17
	Pts: Brooks, Crvendakić 15; Rebs: Krajišnik 4 Asts: Anderson 8	Boxscore	Pts: Šulskė 15; Rebs: Miškinienė 8 Asts: Jocytė, Zdanevičiūtė 3	Arena: Ahmet Cömert Sport Hall; Referees: Valerio Grigioni (ITA), Thomas Bissuel (FRA), Steve Bittner (GER)

Games involving Albania

14 November 2019	Lithuania	108–43	Albania	Kėdainiai
18:30	Scoring by quarter: 21–11, 24–8, 32–15, 31–9
	Pts: Grigalauskytė 20; Rebs: Grigalauskytė 15; Asts: Baltkojienė 6	Boxscore	Pts: Lalaj 16; Rebs: Verri, Xhanaj 7 Asts: Lalaj 4	Arena: Kėdainiai Arena; Referees: Elena Chernova (RUS), Ewa Matuszewska (POL), Margarita Petrenko (RUS)

17 November 2019	Albania	34–139	Serbia	Durrës
16:00	Scoring by quarter: 15–36, 8–38, 4–32, 7–33
	Pts: Xhanaj 13; Rebs: Lalaj 7 Asts: Mehmeti 3	Boxscore	Pts: Milić 24; Rebs: Milić 9 Asts: Milj. Bojović 8	Arena: Dhimitraq Goga Sports Palace; Referees: Martin Horozov (BUL), Thomas Bissuel (FRA), Ventsislav Velikov (BUL)

=== Group F ===
Pos	Team	Pld	W	L	PF	PA	PD	Pts	Qualification
1	Belarus	4	3	1	293	233	+60	7	Final tournament
2	Great Britain	4	2	2	268	269	−1	6	
3	Poland	4	1	3	229	288	−59	5	

Source: FIBA
Rules for classification: 1) Points; 2) Head-to-head; 3) Points difference; 4) Points scored.

14 November 2019	Poland	63–75	Great Britain	Wałbrzych
18:15	Scoring by quarter: 14–21, 12–14, 20–26, 17–14
	Pts: Kastanek 18; Rebs: Koc 7 Asts: Idczak 7	Boxscore	Pts: Simpson 18; Rebs: Green 10; Asts: five players 3	Arena: Aqua Zdrój Arena; Referees: Andrada Csender (ROU), Sonia Teixeira (POR), Goran Sljivic (AUT)

17 November 2019	Great Britain	59–90	Belarus	Manchester
17:00	Scoring by quarter: 15–21, 12–19, 15–20, 17–30
	Pts: Fagbenle 16; Rebs: Fagbenle 8 Asts: Jones, Vanderwal 4	Boxscore	Pts: Papova 24; Rebs: Verameyenka 11; Asts: Tarasava 6	Arena: Belle Vue Sports Village; Referees: Oskars Lucis (LAT), Boris Krejić (SLO), Silvia Marziali (ITA)

14 November 2020	Great Britain	77–49	Poland	Istanbul, Turkey
21:00	Scoring by quarter: 10–15, 27–13, 16–13, 24–8
	Pts: Handy 19; Rebs: Fagbenle, Simpson 9 Asts: Fagbenle, Simpson 5	Boxscore	Pts: Kastanek 16; Rebs: Rembiszewka 7 Asts: Drop 3	Arena: Ahmet Cömert Sport Hall; Referees: Jelena Tomić (CRO), Haris Bijedić (BIH), Péter Praksch (HUN)

3 February 2021 (Note: The match, originally scheduled for 12 November 2020, was postponed due to traveling restrictions for the Belarusian team.)	Belarus	56–68	Poland	Riga, Latvia
14:00	Scoring by quarter: 12–17, 13–16, 16–13, 15–22
	Pts: Papova 13; Rebs: Verameyenka 8 Asts: Ziuzkova 5	Boxscore	Pts: Kastanek 23; Rebs: Telenga 11; Asts: Gajda 6	Arena: Arēna Rīga; Referees: Jasmina Juras (SRB), Mārtiņš Kozlovskis (LAT), Blaž Zupančič (SLO)

4 February 2021	Belarus	67–57	Great Britain	Riga, Latvia
13:30	Scoring by quarter: 14–12, 20–21, 18–18, 15–6
	Pts: Rytsikava 17; Rebs: Verameyenka 10; Asts: four players 4	Boxscore	Pts: Fagbenle 23; Rebs: Fagbenle 13; Asts: Samuelson 4	Arena: Arēna Rīga; Referees: Mārtiņš Kozlovskis (LAT), Jasmina Juras (SRB), Marion Ortis (FRA)

6 February 2021	Poland	49–80	Belarus	Riga, Latvia
13:30	Scoring by quarter: 12–23, 17–20, 12–14, 8–23
	Pts: Skobel, Telenga 8 Rebs: Telenga 7 Asts: Gajda 9	Boxscore	Pts: Snytsina 14; Rebs: Likhtarovich, Papova 5 Asts: Likhtarovich 6	Arena: Arēna Rīga; Referees: Can Mavisu (TUR), Blaž Zupančič (SLO), Juozas Barkauskas (LTU)

=== Group G ===
Pos	Team	Pld	W	L	PF	PA	PD	Pts	Qualification
1	Belgium	6	6	0	465	351	+114	12	Final tournament
2	Ukraine	6	4	2	465	429	+36	10	
3	Portugal	6	1	5	366	405	−39	7 (Note: Portugal 133–118 Finland)	
4	Finland	6	1	5	364	475	−111	7	

Source: FIBA
Rules for classification: 1) Points; 2) Head-to-head; 3) Points difference; 4) Points scored.
Notes:

14 November 2019	Belgium	83–66	Ukraine	Charleroi
20:30	Scoring by quarter: 23–17, 20–13, 17–10, 23–26
	Pts: Meesseman 22; Rebs: Linskens, Meesseman 6 Asts: Allemand 5	Boxscore	Pts: Iagupova 32; Rebs: Iagupova 11; Asts: Sivakova 3	Arena: RTL Spiroudome; Referees: Esperanza Mendoza (ESP), Martin Vulić (CRO), Steve Bittner (GER)

14 November 2019	Portugal	71–48	Finland	Matosinhos
21:00	Scoring by quarter: 17–14, 16–13, 20–8, 18–13
	Pts: Silva 17; Rebs: Silva 9 Asts: Viana 6	Boxscore	Pts: Lehtoranta 11; Rebs: Aijanen 6 Asts: Lehtoranta 4	Arena: Pavilhão de Guifões; Referees: Zdenko Tomašovič (SVK), Yasmina Alcaraz (ESP), Amel Dahra (FRA)

17 November 2019	Finland	58–85	Belgium	Espoo
17:00	Scoring by quarter: 13–20, 17–22, 9–34, 19–9
	Pts: Mäkitalo 15; Rebs: Kuier 6 Asts: Mäkitalo 6	Boxscore	Pts: Meesseman 32; Rebs: Meesseman 7 Asts: Carpréaux 9	Arena: Tapiolan urheiluhalli Referees: Ivor Matějek (CZE), Paulina Gajdosz (POL), Gatis Saliņš (LAT)

17 November 2019	Ukraine	72–60	Portugal	Kharkiv
18:00	Scoring by quarter: 21–9, 25–19, 9–18, 17–14
	Pts: Iagupova 29; Rebs: Naumenko 13; Asts: Iagupova, Naumenko 5	Boxscore	Pts: Silva 19; Rebs: Silva 6 Asts: Viana 7	Arena: Sports Palace "Lokomotyv"; Referees: Andris Aunkrogers (LAT), Jelena Smiljanić (SRB), Suzana Vujičić (MNE)

12 November 2020	Ukraine	84–66	Finland	Odivelas, Portugal
15:00	Scoring by quarter: 22–25, 28–14, 20–17, 14–10
	Pts: Iagupova 22; Rebs: Iagupova 12; Asts: Iagupova 10	Boxscore	Pts: Lahtinen 18; Rebs: Koskimies, Pelander 6 Asts: Koskimies, Lehtoranta 3	Arena: Pavilhão Multiusos de Odivelas; Referees: Andrada Csender (ROU), Simon Unsworth (GBR), Marion Ortis (FRA)

12 November 2020	Portugal	49–59	Belgium	Odivelas
18:00	Scoring by quarter: 10–16, 7–17, 14–17, 18–9
	Pts: Correia 12; Rebs: Silva 5 Asts: three players 2	Boxscore	Pts: Mestdagh 17; Rebs: Massey 7 Asts: Allemand 8	Arena: Pavilhão Multiusos de Odivelas; Referees: Marko Vučković (SLO), Ventsislav Velikov (BUL), Blaž Zupančič (SLO)

14 November 2020	Ukraine	65–87	Belgium	Odivelas, Portugal
18:00	Scoring by quarter: 17–29, 20–16, 10–12, 18–30
	Pts: Iagupova 32; Rebs: Iagupova, Naumenko 7 Asts: Iagupova 7	Boxscore	Pts: Allemand 18; Rebs: Raman 14; Asts: Delaere, Mestdagh 5	Arena: Pavilhão Multiusos de Odivelas; Referees: Andrada Csender (ROU), Esperanza Mendoza (ESP), Blaž Zupančič (SLO)

14 November 2020	Finland	70–62	Portugal	Odivelas, Portugal
21:00	Scoring by quarter: 14–17, 16–13, 14–14, 26–18
	Pts: Koskimies 21; Rebs: Lahtinen 11; Asts: Lahtinen 5	Boxscore	Pts: Silva 17; Rebs: Silva 9 Asts: Viana 7	Arena: Pavilhão Multiusos de Odivelas; Referees: Marko Vučković (SLO), Ventsislav Velikov (BUL), Simon Unsworth (GBR)

4 February 2021	Belgium	82–47	Finland	Matosinhos, Portugal
15:00	Scoring by quarter: 25–20, 14–12, 28–13, 15–2
	Pts: Meesseman 18; Rebs: Meesseman 10; Asts: Raman 6	Boxscore	Pts: Kuier 20; Rebs: Lehtoranta 8 Asts: Lehtoranta 3	Arena: Centro de Desportos e Congressos; Referees: Ivor Matějek (CZE), Paulina Gajdosz (POL), Vladimir Jevtović (SRB)

4 February 2021	Portugal	58–87	Ukraine	Matosinhos
18:00	Scoring by quarter: 16–21, 12–12, 17–30, 13–24
	Pts: Correia 18; Rebs: Kostourkova 11; Asts: Ferreira 4	Boxscore	Pts: Matsko 29; Rebs: Naumenko 11; Asts: Iagupova 14	Arena: Centro de Desportos e Congressos; Referees: Ilias Kounelles (CYP), Mehmet Şahin (TUR), Sinem Tetik (TUR)

6 February 2021	Finland	75–91	Ukraine	Matosinhos, Portugal
15:00	Scoring by quarter: 15–27, 19–25, 17–18, 24–21
	Pts: Kuier 30; Rebs: Kuier 14; Asts: Lehtoranta 5	Boxscore	Pts: Naumenko 24; Rebs: Naumenko 9 Asts: Iagupova 11	Arena: Centro de Desportos e Congressos; Referees: Ilias Kounelles (CYP), Mehmet Şahin (TUR), Maxime Boubert (FRA)

6 February 2021	Belgium	69–66	Portugal	Matosinhos, Portugal
18:00	Scoring by quarter: 17–16, 19–19, 21–16, 12–15
	Pts: Meesseman 23; Rebs: Massey 7 Asts: Delaere, Meesseman 5	Boxscore	Pts: Silva 16; Rebs: Silva 10; Asts: Ferreira 6	Arena: Centro de Desportos e Congressos; Referees: Ivor Matějek (CZE), Paulina Gajdosz (POL), Sinem Tetik (TUR)

=== Group H ===
Pos	Team	Pld	W	L	PF	PA	PD	Pts	Qualification
1	Slovakia	4	2	2	261	252	+9	6	Final tournament
2	Hungary	4	2	2	257	250	+7	6	
3	Netherlands	4	2	2	248	264	−16	6	

Source: FIBA
Rules for classification: 1) Points; 2) Head-to-head; 3) Points difference; 4) Points scored.

14 November 2019	Netherlands	66–56	Hungary	Amsterdam
19:30	Scoring by quarter: 11–19, 15–7, 24–20, 16–10
	Pts: Hof 18; Rebs: Hof 8 Asts: Kuijt 10	Boxscore	Pts: Turner 20; Rebs: Határ 17; Asts: Turner 5	Arena: Sporthallen Zuid; Referees: Özlem Yalman (TUR), Geert Jacobs (BEL), Maxime Boubert (FRA)

17 November 2019	Hungary	73–59	Slovakia	Sopron
20:30	Scoring by quarter: 13–19, 23–13, 24–11, 13–16
	Pts: Határ 20; Rebs: Határ 10; Asts: Studer 7	Boxscore	Pts: Oroszová 14; Rebs: Oroszová 12; Asts: Hruščáková 4	Arena: Aréna Sopron; Referees: Jasmina Juras (SRB), Jelena Tomić (SRB), Martin Vulić (CRO)

12 November 2020	Slovakia	84–64	Netherlands	Amsterdam, Netherlands
18:30	Scoring by quarter: 19–22, 17–21, 25–11, 23–10
	Pts: Bálintová 20; Rebs: Jurčenková, Oroszová 8 Asts: Bálintová 8	Boxscore	Pts: Hof 22; Rebs: Van Grinsven, Hof 7 Asts: Van den Adel 7	Arena: Sporthallen Zuid; Referees: Jelena Smiljanić (SRB), Valerio Grigioni (ITA), Vasileios Pitsilkas (GRE)

14 November 2020	Hungary	63–68	Netherlands	Amsterdam, Netherlands
19:30	Scoring by quarter: 9–19, 14–16, 22–16, 18–17
	Pts: Dubei, Goree 16; Rebs: Goree 15; Asts: Aho 4	Boxscore	Pts: Van den Adel 15; Rebs: Hof 12; Asts: Westerik 7	Arena: Sporthallen Zuid; Referees: Jelena Smiljanić (SRB), Valerio Grigioni (ITA), Vasileios Pitsilkas (GRE)

4 February 2021	Slovakia	57–65	Hungary	Piešťany
18:00	Scoring by quarter: 22–19, 9–23, 11–3, 15–20
	Pts: Slamová 13; Rebs: Jurčenková 7 Asts: Bálintová 7	Boxscore	Pts: Határ 25; Rebs: Határ 11; Asts: Fegyverneky 7	Arena: Diplomat Aréna; Referees: Goran Sljivic (AUT), Vasileios Pitsilkas (GRE), Gintaras Mačiulis (LTU)

6 February 2021	Netherlands	50–61	Slovakia	Piešťany, Slovakia
17:30	Scoring by quarter: 10–15, 11–14, 16–12, 13–20
	Pts: Westerik 12; Rebs: Treffers 13; Asts: Van den Adel 5	Boxscore	Pts: Praženicová, Slamová 11; Rebs: Oroszová 7 Asts: Bálintová 5	Arena: Diplomat Aréna; Referees: Vasileios Pitsilkas (GRE), Gintaras Mačiulis (LTU), Josip Jurčević (CRO)

=== Group I ===
Pos	Team	Pld	W	L	PF	PA	PD	Pts	Qualification
1	Croatia	4	3	1	325	300	+25	7	Final tournament
2	Latvia	4	2	2	293	282	+11	6	
3	Germany	4	1	3	282	318	−36	5	
4	North Macedonia (Note: North Macedonia forfeited the games against Latvia and Croatia and was subsequently disqualified. Their results are void.)	0	0	0	0	0	0	0	Disqualified

Source: FIBA
Rules for classification: 1) Points; 2) Head-to-head; 3) Points difference; 4) Points scored.
Notes:

14 November 2019	Latvia	65–83	Croatia	Riga
19:45	Scoring by quarter: 18–21, 9–23, 13–19, 25–20
	Pts: Dikaioulaku 17; Rebs: Vītola 14; Asts: Jākobsone 8	Boxscore	Pts: Dojkić 27; Rebs: Begić 13; Asts: Dojkić 8	Arena: Olympic Sports Centre; Referees: Janusz Calik (POL), Ventsislav Velikov (BUL), Alexandra Deman (FRA)

17 November 2019	Croatia	93–86	Germany	Zabok
19:00	Scoring by quarter: 26–20, 18–34, 26–13, 23–19
	Pts: Dojkić 27; Rebs: Tikvić 5 Asts: Brkić 8	Boxscore	Pts: Sabally 33; Rebs: Greinacher, Sabally 10; Asts: Brunckhorst 6	Arena: Zabok Sports Hall; Referees: Özlem Yalman (TUR), Geert Jacobs (BEL), Beniamino Attard (ITA)

12 November 2020	Germany	73–67	Latvia	Riga, Latvia
19:45	Scoring by quarter: 13–20, 13–12, 21–16, 26–19
	Pts: Geiselsöder 20; Rebs: Guelich 11; Asts: Brunckhorst 7	Boxscore	Pts: Dikaioulaku 21; Rebs: Šteinberga 10; Asts: Dikaioulaku 6	Arena: Olympic Sports Centre; Referees: Marek Maliszewski (POL), Mehmet Şahin (TUR), Valentin Oliot (FRA)

14 November 2020	Croatia	69–83	Latvia	Riga, Latvia
19:45	Scoring by quarter: 12–23, 15–21, 27–17, 15–22
	Pts: Dojkić 25; Rebs: Begić 11; Asts: Mašić, Petrak 4	Boxscore	Pts: Dikaioulaku 20; Rebs: Dikaioulaku, Vītola 6 Asts: Dikaioulaku, Vītola 4	Arena: Olympic Sports Centre; Referees: Marek Maliszewski (POL), Mehmet Şahin (TUR), Valentin Oliot (FRA)

4 February 2021	Germany	66–80	Croatia	Riga, Latvia
16:30	Scoring by quarter: 23–18, 11–23, 11–24, 21–15
	Pts: Geiselsöder 21; Rebs: Greinacher 13; Asts: Brunckhorst 8	Boxscore	Pts: Slonjšak 23; Rebs: Slonjšak 10; Asts: Dojkić 6	Arena: Arēna Rīga; Referees: Martin Horozov (BUL), Can Mavisu (TUR), Valentin Oliot (FRA)

6 February 2021	Latvia	78–57	Germany	Riga
19:45	Scoring by quarter: 20–14, 15–5, 18–13, 25–25
	Pts: Šteinberga 21; Rebs: Šteinberga 11; Asts: Babkina 7	Boxscore	Pts: Hebecker 14; Rebs: Geiselsöder, Greinacher 8 Asts: Brunckhorst 5	Arena: Arēna Rīga; Referees: Jasmina Juras (SRB), Martin Horozov (BUL), Raúl Zamorano Sánchez (ESP)

Games involving North Macedonia

14 November 2019	Germany	105–40	North Macedonia	Nördlingen
19:00	Scoring by quarter: 28–10, 25–10, 19–4, 33–16
	Pts: Sabally 23; Rebs: Greinacher 13; Asts: Sabally 6	Boxscore	Pts: Stojanovska 16; Rebs: Selcova 8 Asts: Selcova, Stojanovska 3	Arena: Hermann-Keßler-Halle; Referees: Viola Györgyi (NOR), Veronika Vávrová (CZE), Cecília Tóth (HUN)

17 November 2019	North Macedonia	39–98	Latvia	Skopje
19:00	Scoring by quarter: 4–25, 7–21, 19–27, 9–25
	Pts: Selcova 11; Rebs: Trajchevska 7 Asts: Sa. Lazareska, So. Lazareska 2	Boxscore	Pts: Dikaioulaku 22; Rebs: Meļņika 11; Asts: Jākobsone 7	Arena: Jane Sandanski Arena; Referees: Zafer Yılmaz (TUR), Kerem Baki (TUR), Amalia Marchiş (ROU)

12 November 2020	Croatia	80–62	North Macedonia	Riga, Latvia
16:30	Scoring by quarter: 28–17, 18–18, 21–16, 13–11
	Pts: Dojkić 30; Rebs: Mašić 10; Asts: Dojkić 8	Boxscore	Pts: Bonner 20; Rebs: Bonner 17; Asts: Bonner 7	Arena: Olympic Sports Centre; Referees: Elena Chernova (RUS), Viola Györgyi (NOR), Ilya Putenko (RUS)

14 November 2020	North Macedonia	59–74	Germany	Riga, Latvia
16:30	Scoring by quarter: 13–17, 20–12, 14–21, 12–24
	Pts: Mitrasinovik 30; Rebs: Bonner 11; Asts: Mitrasinovik 6	Boxscore	Pts: Hebecker 21; Rebs: Gülich 17; Asts: Brunckhorst 9	Arena: Olympic Sports Centre; Referees: Elena Chernova (RUS), Viola Györgyi (NOR), Ilya Putenko (RUS)

=== Ranking of second-placed teams ===
The five best second-placed teams from the groups qualify for the final tournament. Matches against the fourth-placed team in each group are not included in this ranking.

Pos	Grp	Team	Pld	W	L	PF	PA	PD	Pts	Qualification
1	D	Italy	4	3	1	304	252	+52	7	Final tournament
2	B	Montenegro	4	3	1	275	253	+22	7	Final tournament
3	C	Bosnia and Herzegovina	4	3	1	285	264	+21	7	Final tournament
4	E	Turkey	4	2	2	273	248	+25	6	Final tournament
5	A	Greece	4	2	2	280	268	+12	6	Final tournament
6	I	Latvia	4	2	2	293	282	+11	6	
7	H	Hungary	4	2	2	257	250	+7	6	
8	G	Ukraine	4	2	2	290	288	+2	6	
9	F	Great Britain	4	2	2	268	269	−1	6	

Source: FIBA
Rules for classification: 1) Points; 2) Points difference; 3) Points scored.

== Qualified teams ==
Country	Qualified as	Date of qualification	Last appearance	Best placement in tournament
France	Host nation	15 July 2019	2019	Champions (2001, 2009)
Spain	Host nation	15 July 2019	2019	Champions (1993, 2013, 2017, 2019)
Belgium	Group G winner	14 November 2020	2019	Third place (2017)
Serbia	Group E winner	11 December 2020	2019	Champions (2015)
Sweden	Group B winner	11 December 2020	2019	Fifth place (2019)
Bosnia and Herzegovina	Top 5 ranked of second-placed teams	4 February 2021	1999	Tenth place (1999)
Croatia	Group I winner	4 February 2021	2015	Fifth place (2011)
Slovenia	Group A winner	4 February 2021	2019	Tenth place (2019)
Belarus	Group F winner	6 February 2021	2019	Third place (2007)
Czech Republic	Group D winner	6 February 2021	2019	Champions (2005)
Russia	Group C winner	6 February 2021	2019	Champions (2003, 2007, 2011)
Slovakia	Group H winner	6 February 2021	2017	Runners-up (1997)
Montenegro	Top 5 ranked of second-placed teams	6 February 2021	2019	Sixth place (2011)
Italy	Top 5 ranked of second-placed teams	6 February 2021	2019	Champions (1938)
Turkey	Top 5 ranked of second-placed teams	6 February 2021	2019	Runners-up (2011)
Greece	Top 5 ranked of second-placed teams	6 February 2021	2017	Fourth place (2017)
