= Emilie Hesseldal =

Danish basketball player (born 1990)

Personal information
- Born: 21 December 1990 (age 35) Aarhus, Denmark
- Listed height: 185 cm (6 ft 1 in)

Career information
- College: Eckerd (2012–2013); Colorado State (2013–2016)
- Playing career: 2006–present
- Position: Power forward / center

Career history
- 2006–2011: Aabyhøj IF
- 2012: Horsholm 79ers
- 2017–2018: Stevnsgade BBK
- 2018–2019: Vitória S.C.
- 2019–2020: Skallagrímur
- 2020–2021: BMS Herlev Wolfpack
- 2021-2022: AKS Falcon
- 2022-2023: IK Eos
- 2023: Knox Raiders
- 2023–2025: Njarðvík
- 2025–2026: Grindavík

Career highlights
- 2x Dameligaen champion (2021, 2022); 2x Danish Cup (2010, 2022); 2x Icelandic Cup (2020, 2025); Dameligaen MVP (2022); 2xDameligaen Finals MVP (2021, 2022); Dameligaen All-First Team (2018); 2x Dameligaen rebounding leader (2018, 2022); Dameligaen assist leader (2022); 4x Dameligaen steals leader (2010, 2011, 2018, 2022); LFB rebounding leader (2019); Úrvalsdeild kvenna rebounding leader (2020)

Emilie Sofie Hesseldal (born 21 December 1990) is a Danish professional basketball player and a member of the Danish national basketball team. She won the Danish championship in 2021 as a member of BMS Herlev Wolfpack and in 2022 as a member of AKS Falcon, being named the Finals MVP both years. During her career, she has won both the Danish Cup, in 2010 with Aabyhøj IF and 2022 with AKS Falcon, and the Icelandic Cup, in 2020 with Skallagrímur.

A strong rebounder, Hesseldal has led the Danish Dameligaen, the Spanish Liga Feminina de Basquetebol and the Icelandic Úrvalsdeild kvenna in rebounds.

== Playing career ==
=== First years (2006–2012) ===
Hesseldal started her career with Aabyhøj IF in the Dameligaen during the 2006–2007 season. During her second season, she had broken into the starting lineup. She led the league in steals in 2010 and 2011. In 2012, Hesseldal transferred to Horsholm 79ers where she appeared in two games, averaging 25.0 points and 9.0 rebounds, before moving to college in the United States.

=== College years (2012–2016) ===
Hesseldal started her college career with Eckerd College in 2012. In 16 games with the Tritons, she averaged 9.8 points, 5.3 rebounds, 2.8 assists and 2.0 steals per game.

After the season, she transferred to Colorado State. In December 2014, Hesseldal dislocated her left elbow and completely tore her ulnar collateral ligament (UCL). After missing a month, she played through the injury for the remaining of the season and despite requiring a Tommy John surgery to repair the damage, she decided to forgo the surgery prior to her senior season as it would've ended her college career.

=== Post college (2016–2018) ===
After graduating from college, Hesseldal took a year off from basketball. She returned to the court with Stevnsgade BBK prior to the 2017–2018 season and helped the team reach the Dameligaen finals where the club lost to Horsholm 79ers in five games.

=== Vitoria SC (2018–2019) ===
Hesseldal signed with Liga Feminina de Basquetebol club Vitória S.C. for the 2018–2019 season where she went on to average 11.2 points and league leading 12.2 rebounds per game.

=== Iceland (2019–2020) ===
In September 2019, Hesseldal signed with Skallagrímur of the Icelandic Úrvalsdeild kvenna. On 22 November she scored 32 points and grabbed 14 rebounds in a victory against Haukar. On 15 February 2020, Hesseldal helped Skallagrímur win the Icelandic Basketball Cup for the first time, defeating KR in the cup finals.

=== Back in Denmark (2020–2022) ===
Hesseldal signed with Danish team BMS Herlev for the 2020–2021 season. The season ended with BMS winning the Danish championship and Hesseldal receiving the finals MVP award. In 19 league games she averaged 12.5 points, 10.3 rebounds, 3.7 assists and a league leading 3.1 steals per game.

Prior to the 2021–2022 season, Hesseldal signed with newly formed AKS Falcon, a joint team of Ajax København Sportsgymnasium (AKS) and Falcon Basketball. In April 2022, she won the Danish championship and was named the Finals MVP for the second straight season after Falcon swept SISU in the Dameligaen finals. In the championship game, she posted 28 points and 28 rebounds. For the season, she averaged 18.1 points, 16.9 rebounds, 5.5 assists, 3.2 steals and 1.5 blocks and was named the leagues MVP.

=== Sweden (2022–2023) ===
Hesseldal played for IK Eos in the Basketligan dam for the 2022–2023 season where she averaged 15.8 points, 12.1 rebounds and 3.9 assists per game.

=== Australia NBL1 (2023) ===
Following the season in Sweden, Hesseldal signed with Knox Raiders of the NBL1 South.

=== Back in Iceland (2023–present) ===
In August 2023, Hesseldal returned to Iceland and signed with Úrvalsdeild club Njarðvík.

On 22 March 2025, she won the Icelandic Cup for the second time after Njarðvík beat Grindavík in the Cup finals. In the Cup finals she had 14 points and 20 rebounds. She helped Njarðvík reach the 2025 finals where they lost to Haukar. Following the season she signed with Grindavík.

== Statistics ==
=== College statistics ===
Legend
GP	Games played	GS	Games started	MPG	Minutes per game
FG%	Field goal percentage	3P%	3-point field goal percentage	FT%	Free throw percentage
RPG	Rebounds per game	APG	Assists per game	SPG	Steals per game
BPG	Blocks per game	PPG	Points per game	**Bold**	Career high

Year	Team	GP	Points	FG%	3P%	FT%	RPG	APG	SPG	BPG	PPG
2011-12	Eckerd	16	**157**	39.5%	25.0%	**77.9%**	5.3	**2.8**	**2.0**	**0.5**	**9.8**
2012-13	Colorado State	Sat due to NCAA transfer rules									
2013-14	Colorado State	22	42	**41.0%**	0.0%	76.9%	2.0	0.5	0.5	0.1	1.9
2014-15	Colorado State	23	81	39.2%	**40.0%**	68.4%	4.0	0.9	0.4	0.5	3.5
2015-16	Colorado State	**31**	96	36.7%	37.5%	60.0%	**5.7**	1.8	0.7	0.5	3.1
Career		92	376	38.8%	102.5%	38.2%	9.6	1.4	0.8	0.4	4.1
