= Sandra Lind Þrastardóttir =

Icelandic basketball player

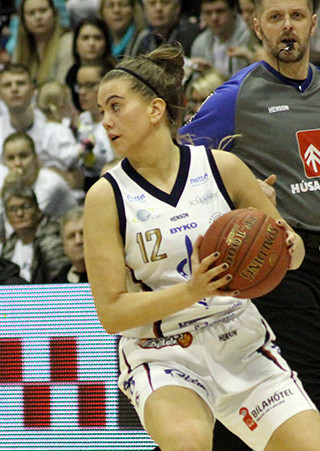
- Sandra Lind with Keflavík in 2015.

Personal information
- Born: 14 June 1996 (age 30)
- Listed height: 182 cm (6 ft 0 in)

Career information
- Playing career: 2011–2018
- Position: Forward
- Number: 12

Career history
- 2011–2016: Keflavík
- 2016–2018: Hørsholm 79ers

Career highlights
- Icelandic champion (2013); Icelandic Basketball Cup (2013); Icelandic Supercup (2013); Danish champion (2018); Danish Basketball Cup (2018)

Sandra Lind Þrastardóttir (born 14 June 1996) is an Icelandic former basketball player and a former member of the Icelandic national basketball team. During her career, she won both the Icelandic and Danish championship along with the Icelandic and Danish Basketball Cup.

== Playing career ==
Sandra came up through the junior ranks of Keflavík and played her first senior game during the 2011–2012 season. She helped the club win the Icelandic Basketball Cup and the Icelandic championship in 2013. During the 2015-2016 season, Sandra had a conflict with Margrét Sturlaugsdóttir, the head coach of Keflavík, which ended with Margrét's firing in January 2016.

Sandra joined Hørsholm 79ers in 2016 and helped the club to the 2017 Dameligaen finals.

On 27 January 2018, Sandra won the Danish Basketball Cup with Hørsholm after beating SISU BK, 71–64, in the cup finals.

On 28 April 2018, Sandra won the Danish championship with the 79ers after beating Stevnsgade in the Dameligaen finals, 3–2.

== Icelandic national basketball team ==
Sandra first played for the Icelandic national basketball team from 2015 to 2018, playing 20 games in total for the team.

== Awards, titles and accomplishments ==
=== Titles ===
==== Denmark ====
- Danish champion: 2018
- Danish Basketball Cup: 2018

==== Iceland ====
- Icelandic champion : 2013
- Icelandic Basketball Cup : 2013
- Icelandic Supercup (2): 2013
- Icelandic Company Cup: 2014
