= Þóra Kristín Jónsdóttir =

Icelandic basketball player

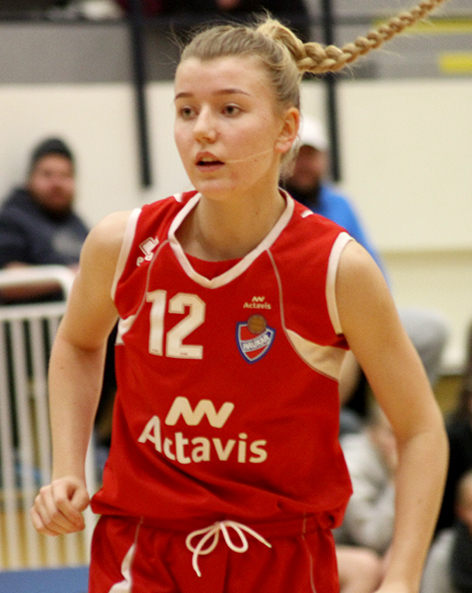
- Þóra Kristín in 2015.

No. 12 – Haukar
- Position: Point guard
- League: Úrvalsdeild kvenna

Personal information
- Born: 30 March 1997 (age 29)
- Listed height: 173 cm (5 ft 8 in)

Career information
- Playing career: 2012–present

Career history
- 2012–2021: Haukar
- 2016: → Skallagrímur
- 2021–2023: AKS Falcon
- 2023–present: Haukar

Career highlights
- Úrvalsdeild Domestic Player of the Year (2025); Úrvalsdeild Playoffs MVP (2025); 4× Úrvalsdeild Domestic All-First Team (2018, 2019, 2021, 2025); 2× Icelandic champion (2018, 2025); 2× Danish champion (2022, 2023); Icelandic Cup (2014); Danish Cup (2022); Icelandic Super Cup (2023)
Medals
Women's basketball
Representing Iceland
Games of the Small States of Europe
Silver medal – second place	2019 Bar	Team

Þóra Kristín Jónsdóttir (born 30 March 1997) is an Icelandic basketball player who plays the point guard position for Haukar in the Úrvalsdeild kvenna and the Icelandic national basketball team. She won the Icelandic championship with Haukar in 2018 while also being named to the Úrvalsdeild Domestic All-First Team and finishing third in the selection of the Icelandic Women's Basketball Player of the Year. She won the Danish championship ind 2022 and 2023 and the Danish Cup in 2022 with AKS Falcon. In 2025, she was named the Úrvalsdeild Domestic Player of the Year and won the Icelandic championship for the second time in her career.

== Career ==
Þóra came up through the junior programs of Haukar and played her first senior game in 2012. On 22 February 2014 she won the Icelandic Basketball Cup after Haukar defeated Snæfell in the Cup finals. On 3 October 2015, she helped Haukar win the Icelandic Company Cup, defeating Keflavík in the final.

In 2016, she was loaned to Skallagrímur where she went on to win 1. deild kvenna. In 9 regular season and playoffs games for Skallagrímur, Þóra averaged 8.3 points and 3.9 rebounds per game.

On 30 April 2018, Þóra won the national championship after Haukar defeated Valur 3–2 in Úrvalsdeild finals. She was instrumental to Haukar's victory in game 3 of the series, scoring 22 points and shooting 4 of 7 from three-point range.

On 28 November 2018, Þóra posted a triple-double with 23 points, 11 rebounds and 11 assists in a victory against Breiðablik.

In December 2018, she finished third in the selection of the Icelandic Women's Basketball Player of the Year, behind Helena Sverrisdóttir and winner Hildur Björg Kjartansdóttir.

On 17 December 2018, she went down with an injury in a game against Grindavík in the Icelandic Basketball Cup which was initially feared to be a ruptured achilles tendon. Later tests revealed that the tendon had not ruptured. She returned to action on 6 January 2019, posting a triple-double of 13 points, 11 assists and 11 rebounds in a victory against Skallagrímur. Þóra Kristín averaged 13.1 points, 6.2 rebounds and 5.9 assists during 2018–19 season and was named to the Úrvalsdeild Domestic All-First Team for the second straight year.

During the 2020–21 season, Þóra averaged 9.3 points and 4.9 assists per game and was once again named to the Úrvalsdeild Domestic All-First Team.

Þóra signed with AKS Falcon of the Kvindebasketligaen prior to the 2021–2022 season. In a victory against Åbyhøj, Þóra scored 14 points during a 4-minute span. In March 2022, she won the Danish Cup with the Falcon. In 2022, she won the Danish championship after Falcon swept SISU in the Dameligaen finals.

On 20 April 2023, she helped Falcon to its second straight Danish championship. In the championship clinching game, she posted 7 points, 7 rebounds and a game high 8 assists. For the season, she averaged 11.2 points and 3.2 assists per game while making 37.8% of her three-point shots.

In July, Þóra returned to Iceland and signed back with Haukar. On 20 September 2023, she scored 10 points in Haukar's 78–77 win against Valur in the Icelandic Super Cup.

In March 2025, she was named the Úrvalsdeild Domestic Player of the Year for the 2024–2025 season. In May, she won the national championship for the second time in her career.

== Icelandic national team ==
Þóra was first selected to the Icelandic national basketball team in 2017 and was selected for its games in the EuroBasket Women 2019 qualification.

== Awards, titles and accomplishments ==
=== Individual awards ===
- Úrvalsdeild Playoffs MVP: 2025
- Úrvalsdeild Domestic All-First Team: 2018, 2019, 2021, 2025

=== Titles ===
- Icelandic champion: 2018, 2025
- Icelandic Cup: 2014
- Dameligaen champion: 2022, 2023
- Danish Cup: 2022
- Icelandic Company Cup: 2015
- 1. deild kvenna: 2016
