= 2024–25 Kvindebasketligaen =

Women's basketball league in Denmark

Kvindebasketligaen
- Season: 2024–25
- Dates: Regular season: 21 September 2024 – 17 March 2025; Play Offs: 22 March – 12 April 2025
- Teams: 5

Regular season
- Season MVP: (Denmark) Julianna Okosun

Finals
- Champions: AKS Falcon (4th title)
- Runners-up: Aabyhøj IF
- Finals MVP: (Denmark) Julianna Okosun

Statistical leaders
Points	(Denmark) Julianna Okosun	23.4
Rebounds	(Denmark) Julianna Okosun	13.5
Assists	(Denmark) Taylor Gleason	5.9
Steals	(Denmark) Taylor Gleason	3.5
Blocks	(Denmark) Helene Dalsgaard	2.0

The 2024–25 Kvindebasketligaen is the 54th season of the top division women's basketball league in Denmark since its establishment in 1971. It starts in September 2024 with the first round of the regular season and ends in April 2025.

AKS Falcon are the defending champions.

AKS Falcon won their fourth title after beating Aabyhøj IF in the final.

== Format ==
Each team plays each other four times. The top four teams qualify for the play offs. The semifinals are played as a best of three series while the final is played as a best of five series.

== Regular season ==
Pos	Team	Pld	W	L	PF	PA	PD	Pts	Qualification
1	Aabyhøj IF	16	14	2	1149	912	+237	30	Play Offs
2	AKS Falcon	16	13	3	1276	1008	+268	29	Play Offs
3	SISU BK	16	9	7	1122	1112	+10	25	Play Offs
4	BMS Herlev	16	2	14	992	1198	−206	18 (Note: BMS Herlev 286–264 BK Amager)	Play Offs
5	BK Amager	16	2	14	914	1223	−309	18	

Source: Kvindebasketligaen
Rules for classification: 1) Points; 2) Points difference; 3) Points scored.

== Play offs ==
Semifinals	Final
1	Aabyhøj IF	68	78	2
4	BMS Herlev	53	37	0
1	Aabyhøj IF	65	65	73	0
2	AKS Falcon	67	75	80	3
2	AKS Falcon	88	80	78	2
3	SISU BK	75	81	75	1	Third place
3	SISU BK	69	1
4	BMS Herlev	66	0

Champions of Denmark

AKS Falcon
Fourth title
