= Sisu (disambiguation) =

Sisu is a Finnish concept of stoic determination and tenacity.

Sisu or SISU may also refer to:

== Arts and entertainment ==
- Sisu (album), a 1998 album by Finnish jazz pianist Iiro Rantala
- Sisu (band), an American indie rock band
- Starship Sisu, in the book Citizen of the Galaxy by Robert A. Heinlein
- Sisu (Raya and the Last Dragon), a dragon character in Raya and the Last Dragon
- Sisu Pala, character in the ancient Indian epic Mahabharata
- Sisu (film), a 2022 Finnish action film
  - Sisu: Road to Revenge, a 2025 sequel action film

== Transportation and military ==
- Sisu 1A, an American competition sailplane
- Sisu Auto, a Finnish truck manufacturer

=== Ships ===
- Sisu-class motor torpedo boat (1919–1942), of the Finnish Navy
- Sisu (1938 icebreaker), a Finnish ship
- Sisu (1975 icebreaker), a Finnish ship

== Other uses ==
- Sisu (candy), a Finnish brand of candy
- Sisu (given name), a Finnish male given name
- Mount Sisu, a mountain in Antarctica
- SISU BK, a Danish basketball club
- SiSU (Structured information, serialized units), a Unix framework
- Dalbergia sissoo or sisu, a hardy deciduous rosewood tree
- Shanghai International Studies University, in China
- Sichuan International Studies University, in Chongqing, China
- Sistema de Seleção Unificada, a Brazilian digital platform

== See also ==
- Suomen Sisu, a Finnish association
- La Familia (rap group) or Sișu & Puya, a Romanian hip hop group
