= Masic =

Masic, or Mašić, is a surname which may refer to:

- Admir Masic, American engineer
- Ante Mašić (born 1985), Bosnian basketball player
- Mia Mašić (born 1993), Croatian female basketball player
- Pavao Mašić (born 1980), Croatian harpsichordist and organist
- Sead Mašić (born 1959), Bosnian footballer
