= Danish Basketball Cup =

Danish Basketball Cup is a name given to basketball cup competitions in Denmark and may refer to:

- Danish Men's Basketball Cup, the top tier men's basketball cup in Denmark
- Danish Women's Basketball Cup, the top tier women's basketball cup in Denmark
