= Hrannar Hólm =

Icelandic basketball coach

Personal information
- Born: 17 April 1964 (age 62) Iceland

Career information
- Playing career: 198?–198?
- Coaching career: 1994–2017

Career history

Playing
- 1982–1986: Keflavík
- 198?–198?: TV Stuttgart Zuffenhausen

Coaching
- 1994–1995: Þór Akureyri (Men's)
- 1995–1996: Njarðvík (Men's)
- 1997–1998: KR (Men's)
- 2010–2014: SISU BK (Women's)
- 2014–2017: Denmark (Women's)

Career highlights
- As player: 1. deild karla (1985); As coach: 2x Dameligaen coach of the year (2010, 2014); 4x Dameligaen champion (2011–2014); 4x Danish Women's Basketball Cup (2011–2014); Icelandic Men's Basketball Supercup (1995)

Career coaching record
- Dameligaen: 66–4 (.943)
- Úrvalsdeild karla: 62–34 (.646)

Hrannar Hólm (born 17 April 1964) is an Icelandic former basketball coach. He was the head coach of the Danish women's national basketball team from 2014 to 2017. From 2011 to 2014, he led SISU BK to four straight Dameligaen championships.

== Career ==
=== Iceland ===
Hrannar coached for five seasons in the Icelandic Úrvalsdeild karla, accumulating a 62-34 record (64,6%). His best season came in 1995-1996 when he led defending champions Njarðvík to a 28-4 record, including a 17-game winning streak to finish the season. Although the team had the best record in the league it fell out in the quarter-finals in the playoffs against Keflavík.

=== Denmark ===
Hrannar took over as coach of SISU BK late in the 2009-2010 season when the team was in 8-9th place and helped it achieve 2nd-place finish. For the next four seasons he guided the club to four national championships. He was named the coach of the year in 2010 and 2014. In May 2014 he was hired as the head coach of the Danish women's national basketball team.
