= Kathleen Martin =

American publisher

Kathleen Martin is an American small press publisher, book editor and actor. She is the co-founder of Wit's End Publishingand a senior editor of Point Blank Press, a crime fiction publisher.

Her early career, after receiving an academic scholarship to Brown University, centered on acting and theatre. She studied under Sanford Meisner at New York's Neighborhood Playhouse, performed with the Boston Shakespeare Company and Harvard University Choir. Her acting included also work with David Mamet.

She worked behind the scenes in theatre by managing the young people's program at the Los Angeles Lee Strasberg Theatre and Film Institute and as the managing director of the Chicago Trinity Square Ensemble Theatre.

After founding Wit's End Publishing, she published and edited the Charles Willeford collection, The Second Half of the Double Feature, and the World Fantasy Award and International Horror Guild Award nominated Tainaron: Mail From Another City by Leena Krohn.

She voiced Janice Shriek in the short film adaptation of Jeff VanderMeer's Shriek: An Afterword in 2007.
