= Hørsholm 79ers =

- Leagues: (M) Basketligaen (W) Dameligaen
- Founded: 1979
- History: Hørsholm BK (1979–2007); Hørsholm 79ers Basketball (2007–present)
- Arena: Fire Arena
- Location: Hørsholm, Denmark
- Team colors: Black, White
- Championships: (M) 2 Danish Leagues (W) 9 Danish Leagues
- Website: www.hbbk.dk
| Home | Away |

Hørsholm 79'ers Basketball Klub is a Danish basketball club from Hørsholm founded in 1979, playing both in the male and female Danish championships. The women's team is one of the most successful teams in Danish history, having won 9 national championships between 1996 and 2018, including five titles in a row from 2004 to 2008.

== History ==
On 27 January 2018 Hørsholm won the Danish Women's Basketball Cup after beating SISU BK, 71-64, in the cup finals.

On 28 April 2017 Hørsholm won the women's national championship after defeating Stevnsgade Basketball 68-60 in the fifth and deciding game of the finals series.

In June 2018, Hørsholm announced the men's club would resign to its place in the Basketligaen due to financial problems and would compete in the second tier.

== Titles ==
=== Women's team ===
Danish League

- Winners (9): 1996, 2004, 2005, 2006, 2007, 2008, 2010, 2015, 2018

Danish Cup

- Winners (3): 1994, 1995, 2005, 2018

=== Men's team ===
Danish League

- Winners (2): 1990–91, 1992–93

== Notable players ==
=== Men's ===
Note: Flags indicate national team eligibility at FIBA-sanctioned events. Players may hold other non-FIBA nationalities not displayed.

Criteria

To appear in this section a player must have either:

- Set a club record or won an individual award while at the club
- Played at least one official international match for their national team at any time
- Played at least one official NBA match at any time.

- (Denmark) Daniel Mortensen
- (Denmark) Zarko Jukic

=== Women's ===
Criteria

To appear in this section a player must have either:

- Set a club record or won an individual award while at the club.
- Played at least one official international match for their national team at any time.
- Played at least one official WNBA match at any time.

- (Chinese Taipei) Joy Burke
- (Iceland) Sandra Lind Þrastardóttir
