= List of indoor arenas in Latvia =

The following is a list of indoor arenas in Latvia, ordered by capacity. The venues are by their final capacity after construction for seating-only events. There is more capacity if standing room is included (e.g. for concerts).

== Current arenas ==
Image	Arena	Capacity	City	Home team(s)	Opened/Renovated
	Xiaomi Arena	14,500	Riga	Latvia men's national ice hockey team Latvia men's national basketball team Latvia women's national basketball team Dinamo Riga (KHL); BC VEF Rīga	2006
	Skonto Hall	8,000	Riga	Skonto FC	1996, 2006, 2010
	Olympic Sports Centre Football Hall	6,000 (ice hockey); 300 (football)	Riga		2005, 2021
	Riga National Sports Manege	3,700	Riga		1965
	Ventspils Olympic Center Basketball Hall	3,085	Ventspils	BK Ventspils	1997
	Zemgale Olympic Center sports hall	3,000	Jelgava	BK Jelgava	2010
	Liepāja Olympic Center Arena	2,542	Liepāja	Liepājas Basketbols	2008
	Latvian Team Sports Hall	2,900	Riga		2024
	Volvo Sports Centre	2,500	Riga	HK Prizma Riga	2005
	Liepāja Olympic Center Ice hall	2,283	Liepāja	HK Liepāja	1998
	Daugavpils Ice Arena	1,984	Daugavpils	HK Dinaburga	1999
	Tukums Ice Hall	1,520	Tukums		2005
	Kurbads Ice Hall	1,500	Riga	HK Kurbads; Latvia men's national ice hockey team	2017
	Vidzeme Olympic Centre Universal hall	1,500	Valmiera	BK Valmiera	2005
	Daugavpils Olympic Centre Multifunctional hall	1,350	Daugavpils		2009
	Jelgava Ice Hall	1,300	Jelgava	HC Zemgale/LUA	2001
	Vidzeme Ice Hall	1,300	Ikšķile Municipality		
	Jēkabpils Sports Hall	1,100	Jēkabpils		
	Cēsis Sports Complex hall	1,080	Cēsis		
	Inbox.lv Ice Hall	1,000	Piņķi	HK Rīga; HK Olimp Riga	2003
	Daugava Sports Centre	1,000	Riga		1962, 2003
	Ventspils Ice Hall	942	Ventspils		2000, 2013
	Olympic Sports Centre Multifunctional Hall	800	Riga	BK VEF Rīga; TTT Riga	2005

== See also ==
- List of indoor arenas in Europe
- List of indoor arenas by capacity
