= Lemvig Basket =

- Leagues: Dameligaen; DBBF Division 1 Herrer
- Founded: 2007
- Arena: Vestjysk Bank Arena (capacity: 1,400)
- Location: Lemvig, Denmark
- Team colors: Red and White
- President: (Denmark) Rene Jakobsen
- Website: www.lemvigbasket.dk
Home	Away

Lemvig Basket is a Danish basketball club based in the small town of Lemvig. The club was founded in 2007 as an independent club.

Since then they have steadily improved, and they are currently the top overall Danish basketball club for both men and women. The women's team have been promoted to the Dameligaen, the top league in Denmark. while the men's team have, for several years been between among the top teams in DBBF Herrer Div.1 (2nd best level in Denmark). It maintains a high level of internal competition while offering players at all levels an opportunity to enjoy basketball on teams composed of less experienced Danish basketball players for both sexes. The club focuses on giving younger players an opportunity to improve and this principle is strongly supported by its experienced professionals. Lemvig Basket is a very active club in both sports and social aspects of life and is organizing Denmark's largest basketball tournament, The Limfjords-cup.

== History ==
The club was founded in 2007.

In 2017 the club won their first trophy, when the women's team won the Danish Cup, beting Virum Go Dream in the final.

== 2012/2013 season Men ==
Lemvig Basket - Men's team roster
Players
Coaches

Pos.	No.	Nat.	Name	Ht.	Wt.	Age
SG	4	(Denmark)	Hendriksen, Niels
F	5	(Denmark)	Muralithas, Niththilan
CG	6	(Bulgaria)	Varbanov, Kalin	1.86 m (6 ft 1 in)	82 kg (181 lb)
SG	7	(Denmark)	Kristensen, Mads	1.85 m (6 ft 1 in)
G	9	(Denmark)	Andersen, Mikkel
PF	10	(Australia)	Ireland, Ben
C	12	(Denmark)	Flæng, Søren (C)	2.04 m (6 ft 8 in)
C	14	(Denmark)	Bjørklund, Thomas	2.05 m (6 ft 9 in)
CG	15	(United States)	Reid, Dominick

Head coach

- (United States) Raphael Silva

Legend

- (C) Team captain
- Injured

=== Depth chart ===
Pos.	Starting 5	Bench 1	Bench 2
C	Søren Flæng	Thomas Bjørklund
PF	Ben Ireland	Niththilan Muralithas
SF	Mikkel Andersen
SG	Mads Kristensen	Kalin Varbanov	Niels Hendriksen
PG	Dominick Reid

== 2012/2013 season Woman ==
Lemvig Basket - Women's team roster
Players
Coaches

Pos.	No.	Nat.	Name	Ht.	Wt.	Age
G	4	(North Macedonia)	Udovalieva, Ivana (C)	1.75 m (5 ft 9 in)
G	6	(Denmark)	Kristensen, Ida
PF	7	(United States)	Christine Hatch, Emily
F	8	(United States)	Moore, Mallory
G/F	9	(Denmark)	Hansen, Nanna	1.75 m (5 ft 9 in)
SG	10	(Denmark)	Pedersen, Louise
F	11	(Denmark)	Lund, Kristina
G	12	(Denmark)	Kristiansen, Helle
C	13	(Austria)	Schicher, Sarah
F/C	14	(Denmark)	Kristiansen, Tine	1.77 m (5 ft 10 in)
F	15	(Denmark)	Pedersen, Karina	1.78 m (5 ft 10 in)

Head coach

- (Denmark) Thomas Johansen

Assistant coach(es)

- (Denmark) Peter Jensen

Legend

- (C) Team captain
- Injured

=== Depth chart ===
Pos.	Starting 5	Bench 1	Bench 2
C	Sarah Schicher	Tine Kristiansen
PF	Emily Christine Hatch	Kristina Lund
SF	Mallory Moore	Nanna Hansen	Louise Pedersen
SG	Helle Kristiansen	Karina Pedersen	Ida Kristensen
PG	Ivana Udovalieva

== Previous seasons ==
Men's team:
Season	Division	Pos.	Play-off	Cup Tournament
2007/08	1. div.	10th	No play-offs	
2008/09	1. div.	9th	No play-offs	
2009/10	1. div.	11th	No play-offs	
2010/11	1. div.	3rd	1/2 Final	
2011/12	1. div.	3rd	1/2 Final	
2012/13	1. div.	2nd	1/2 Final	1/4 Final
2013/14	1. div.	2nd	Final	1/16 Final
2014/15	1. div.	8th	1/4 Final	1/16 Final

Women's team:
Season	Division	Pos.	Play-off	Cup Tournament
2007/08	1. div.	1st	No play-offs	
2008/09	Dameligaen	8th	-	
2009/10	Dameligaen	5th	1/4 Final	
2010/11	Dameligaen	3rd	1/4 Final	
2011/12	Dameligaen	6th	Bronze Medal	1/2 Final
2012/13	Dameligaen	2nd	Bronze Medal	Silver Medal
2013/14	Dameligaen	4th	1/2 Final	1/2 Final
2014/15	Dameligaen	1st	Bronze Medal	1/2 Final

== Limfjordscup ==
Every year, between 27 and 30 December, Lemvig Basket are hosting Limfjorgscup which is the largest youth tournament in Denmark with 1.500 participants from all over Europe from. In 2011 it will be 20th time the tournament is held.
