= Wit's End Publishing =

Wit's End Publishing is a small publishing house established in 2003 by JT Lindroos and Kathleen Martin. It has published two titles by Charles Willeford: The Second Half of the Double Feature, a collection of Willeford's short fiction and poetry, and a reprint of The Black Mass of Brother Springer which featured an introduction by James Sallis and included a previously unpublished play based on the novel.
