= Daniel Mortensen =

Danish basketball player (born 1994)

Grindavík
- Position: Center
- League: Úrvalsdeild karla

Personal information
- Born: 21 October 1994 (age 32)
- Listed height: 204 cm (6 ft 8 in)
- Listed weight: 107 kg (236 lb)

Career information
- College: Wright State (2015–2016); Barry (2016–2019)
- Playing career: 2013–present

Career history
- 2013–2015: Hørsholm 79ers
- 2019–2020: Wetterbygden Stars
- 2020: CB Myrtia
- 2020–2021: Bakken Bears
- 2021–2022: Þór Þorlákshöfn
- 2022–2023: Haukar
- 2023–present: Grindavík

Career highlights
- Icelandic League champion (2026); Úrvalsdeild Foreign Player of the Year (2022); Basketligaen champion (2021)

Daniel Andreas Mortensen (born 21 October 1994) is a Danish basketball player for Grindavík of the Icelandic Úrvalsdeild karla and the Denmark national team. He played college basketball for Wright State University and Barry University. In 2021, he won the Basketligaen championship with Bakken Bears and in 2022 he was named the Úrvalsdeild Foreign Player of the Year while playing for Þór Þorlákshöfn.

== Playing career ==
=== Early career ===
Mortensen started his career with the Hørsholm 79ers in 2013 and played two seasons with the team.

=== College career ===
Following his second season with the 79ers, Mortensen joined Wright State University where he played one season with the Wright State Raiders. The following year he transferred to Barry University where he spent the remaining years of his college career.

=== After college ===
Following his college career, Mortensen signed with Wetterbygden Stars of the Swedish Basketball League. In 2020, he signed with CB Myrtia of the LEB Oro but shortly later moved to the Bakken Bears where he won the Basketligaen championship in 2021.

In July 2021, Mortensen signed with reigning Icelandic champions Þór Þorlákshöfn. On 18 February, he scored a career high 47 points in a victory against Breiðablik. For the season, he averaged 18.9 points, 8.4 rebounds and 3.1 assists in 29 regular season and playoff games. For his effort, he was named the Úrvalsdeild Foreign Player of the Year.

On 21 May 2022, Mortensen signed with newly promoted Haukar. For the season he averaged 15.2 points, 8.4 rebounds and 4.7 assists.

In May 2023, Mortensen signed with Grindavík.

On 18 May 2026, he won his first Icelandic championship after Grindavík defeated Tindastóll in the Úrvalsdeild finals, 3–1.

== Personal life ==
Mortensen is the older brother of basketball player Sarah Mortensen.
