= Virum BK =

Danish basketball club

Virum Basketball Klub is a Danish professional basketball club based in Virum, a suburban neighbourhood in Lyngby-Taarbæk Municipality. The Virum men's team plays in the First Division and the women's team in the second division after relegation of the 2010–11 season. For sponsorship reasons the club's current name is Virum Vipers.

== History ==
Virum was founded in 1957 under the name "Virum Statsskoles Basketball Klub" (Virum State School Basketball Club), named after the then newly opened school, which today is called Virum Gymnasium. The club got its first senior team in 1961 and over the following makes both women's and men hold up through the ranks. In 1964, both teams became Copenhagen Champions, and for the men it meant promotion to the country's first division.

In the early seventies the men's team became back to back champions and earned the right to participate in the FIBA European Champions Cup. In 1970–71 season the club played its first European games against Slavia Prague and eliminated in the first round after two easy defeats (63–113 in Virum, 42–146 in Prague). The next season (1971–72 FIBA European Champions Cup) Virum played against Real Madrid without achieves anything more.

== Honours & achievements ==
=== Men ===
Danish League

- Winners (4): 1969–70, 1970–71, 2015–16, 2016–2017

=== Women ===
Danish League

- Winners (3): 1979–80, 2015–16, 2016–17
