= Olympic Sports Centre, Riga =

Multi-functional sports facility in Riga, Latvia

Rimi Olimpiskais centrs
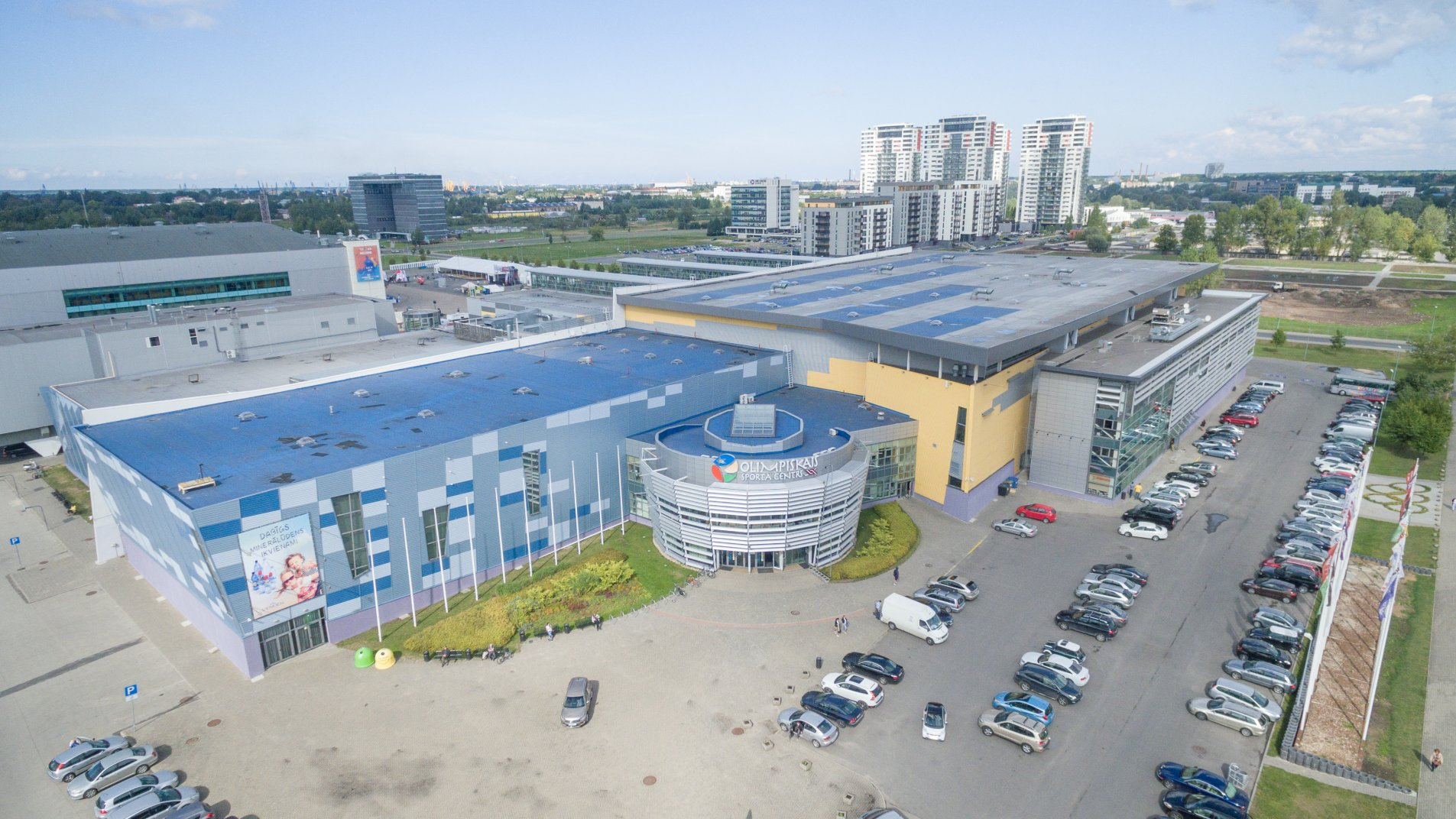
- Rimi Olimpiskais centrs in 2014
- Interactive map of Rimi Olimpiskais centrs
- Full name: Rimi Olimpiskais centrs
- Location: Grostonas 6b, Riga, Latvia
- Coordinates: 56.9679°N 24.1243°E
- Owner: Latvian Olympic Committee
- Operator: SIA Olimpiskais sporta centrs
- Capacity: 830 (multifunctional hall); 300 (football)
- Field size: 23 924,63 m2

Construction
- Opened: 3 June 2005

Tenants
- BK VEF Rīga (LBL); BK Latvijas Universitāte (LBL); TTT Rīga (LSBL, EuroLeague Women)

The Olympic Sports Centre (Latvian: Olimpiskais sporta centrs), from 2016 until 2020: Elektrum Olympic Centre, Elektrum Olimpiskais centrs, from 2021 until now Rimi Olympic Centre, Rimi Olimpiskais centrs) is an indoor multi-functional sports facility in Rīga, Latvia, which was opened in 2005 at the former location of the Riga hippodrome by the Latvian Olympic Committee as part of a nationwide network of Olympic centres designed to improve the training and competition facilities of Latvian athletes.

== Facilities ==
The Olympic Sports Centre covers the area of approximately 24,000 square meters and can be used by more than 4,000 visitors per day. The centre offers a multifunctional sports hall, an artificial turf football hall, facilities for basketball, volleyball, beach volleyball, athletics, swimming, gymnastics and aerobic training, as well as office spaces and a café. The headquarters of the Latvian Olympic Committee and Latvian Football Federation are located at the centre. In 2009, the centre was awarded the “European Healthy Stadia” status.

== Events ==
The arena has hosted a variety of sporting competitions, as well as concerts, seminars and exhibitions, such as the 2006 NATO Riga Summit. It was the second arena of the 2016 Men's World Floorball Championships, the first being Arēna Rīga. It was the second arena of the 2021 Men's ice hockey World Championships, which is hosted only by Latvia. EuroBasket Women 2021 was held in Basketball hall.

== See also ==
- List of indoor arenas in Latvia
