= AKS Falcon =

- Leagues: Kvindebasketligaen
- Founded: 2021; 4 years ago
- History: AKS Falcon; 2021–present
- Arena: Bülowsvejhallen; Valbyhallen
- Location: Copenhagen, Denmark
- Championships: 2 Kvindebasketligaen

AKS Falcon are a Danish women's basketball team. It is a collaboration between Ajax Copenhagen Sports Gymnasium (AKS) and Falcon Basketball and was founded in 2021. The team won the Danish championship in 2022 and 2023, and the Danish Women's Basketball Cup in 2022.

== Notable players ==
Criteria

To appear in this section a player must have either:

- Set a club record or won an individual award while at the club.
- Played at least one official international match for their national team at any time.
- Played at least one official WNBA match at any time.

- (Denmark) Emilie Hesseldal
- (Iceland) Þóra Kristín Jónsdóttir
