= Jana Raman =

Belgian basketball player

No. 6 – CB Claret Benimaclet
- Position: Power forward
- League: LFB2

Personal information
- Born: 15 February 1991 (age 35) Ghent, Belgium
- Listed height: 6 ft 2 in (1.88 m)

Career information
- WNBA draft: 2013: undrafted

Jana Raman (born 15 February 1991) is a Belgian basketball player for CB Claret Benimaclet and the Belgian national team.

She participated at the EuroBasket Women 2017.
