= Tainaron (novel) =

1985 novel by Leena Krohn

Tainaron: Mail from Another City
- Author: Leena Krohn
- Original title: Tainaron: Postia toisesta kaupungista
- Language: Finnish
- Publisher: WSOY
- Publication date: 1985
- Publication place: Finland
- English publication date: 2004
- Media type: Print (Hardback & Paperback)
- Pages: 126 (1st Finnish edition)
- ISBN: 951-0-13063-X
- OCLC: 15631518
- LC Class: PH355.K823 T3 1985

Tainaron: Mail From Another City (orig. Fin. Tainaron: Postia toisesta kaupungista) is a science fiction/fantasy novel written in 1985 by Finnish author Leena Krohn. The book is regarded as the author's breakthrough novel. Tainaron was nominated for the Finlandia Prize in 1985, The Nordic Council Literature Prize in 1988, the World Fantasy Award and the International Horror Guild Award in 2005. It won the Thanks for the Book Award in 1986.

Tainaron consists of 30 letters sent beyond the sea from a city of insects.

The U.S. edition was nominated for the World Fantasy Award and the International Horror Guild Award in 2005. This edition, published by Prime Books in 2004 and edited by Kathleen Martin, adds to the original Finnish publication by adding original illustrations by the author's sister, Inari Krohn, a Finnish painter.

Reviewed in glowing terms by Matthew Cheney, the writing was described as "lyrical and deep, metaphysical, philosophical, poetic". Jeff VanderMeer praised its "scenes of startling beauty and strangeness" and listed it as one of the best novels of 2004.

== Translations ==
- English (2004): Tainaron: Mail from Another City, translator Hilda Hawkins, publisher Prime Books. ISBN 1-930997-82-5
- Estonian (1994): Tainaron: Posti teisest linnast, translator Ele Süvalep, publisher Aniara Kirjastus
- Hungarian (1992): Tainaron, translator Csilla Varga, publisher Európa. Part of the compilation Káin leánya: Mai finn kisregények
- Japanese (2002):, translator Hiroko Suenobu, publisher Shinhyoron Publishing
- Latvian (1998): Tainara: Vestules no citas pilsetas, translator Ingrida Peldekse, publisher Preses nams
- Polish (2008): Tainaron: Listy z innego miasta, translator Sebastian Musielak, publisher Świat Książki. ISBN 978-83-247-0467-5
- Spanish (2017): Tainaron: cartas desde otra ciudad, translator Luisa Gutiérrez Ruiz, publisher Nórdica Libros. ISBN 9788416830336
- Swedish (1987): Tainaron: Brev från en annan stad, translator Thomas Warburton, publisher Fripress Bokförlag. ISBN 91-7896-037-1
