= Milica Deura =

Bosnian women's basketball player

No. 5 – CSU Alba Iulia
- Position: Shooting guard
- League: Romanian League

Personal information
- Born: July 22, 1990 (age 36) Knin, SR Croatia, SFR Yugoslavia
- Listed height: 1.78 m (5 ft 10 in)

Career information
- Playing career: 2005–present

Career history
- 2005-2012: Mladi Krajišnik
- 2012-2013: Partizan
- 2013-2014: Budućnost Volcano
- 2014: Crvena zvezda
- 2014–2016: CSU Alba Iulia
- 2016-2019: TSV 1880 Wasserburg
- 2019-present: Rutronik Stars Keltern

Milica Deura (born July 22, 1990 in Knin, SFR Yugoslavia) is a Bosnian professional basketball player. She played as a point guard who most recently played for the Rutronik Stars Keltern in Eurocup Women.

== Honours ==
Partizan

- National Championship of Serbia: 2012-13
- National Cup of Serbia: 2012-13
- Adriatic League Women: 2012-13
