= Liudmyla Naumenko =

Ukrainian basketball player

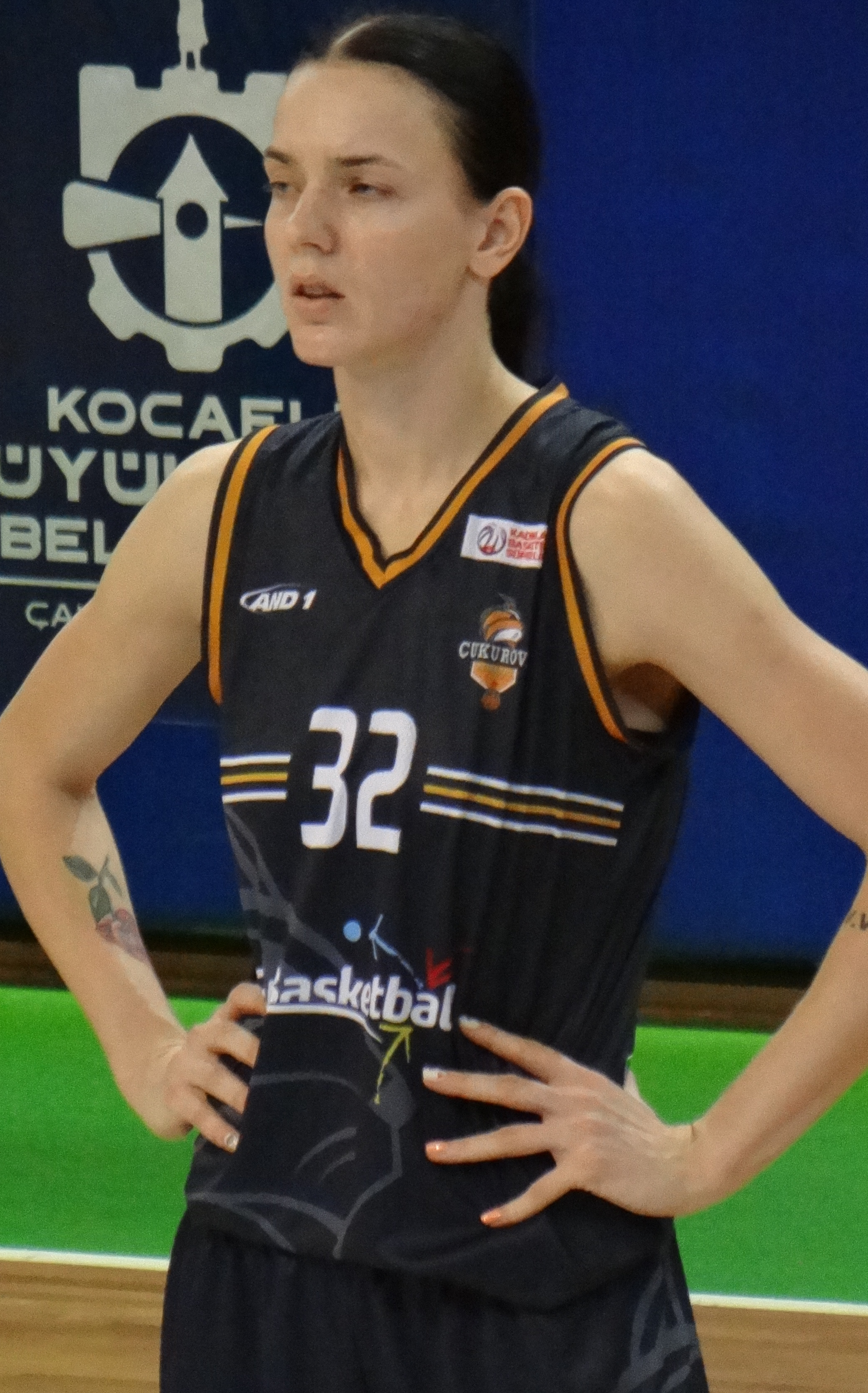

No. 15 – ESB Villeneuve-d'Ascq
- Position: Small forward
- League: LFB

Personal information
- Born: June 30, 1993 (age 32); Pomokli, Ukraine
- Listed height: 6 ft 2 in (1.88 m)
- Listed weight: 149 lb (68 kg)

Liudmyla Naumenko (born June 30, 1993) is a Ukrainian basketball player for ESB Villeneuve-d'Ascq and the Ukrainian national team.

She participated at the EuroBasket Women 2017.
