= Admir Masic =

German academic

- Born: Brod, Bosnia and Herzegovina
- Citizenship: German
- Education: University of Turin
- Scientific career
- Fields: Materials Science
- Workplaces: Center for Materials Research in Archaeology and Ethnology, Max Planck Institute of Colloids and Interfaces, Massachusetts Institute of Technology
- Doctoral advisor: Salvatore Coluccia

Admir Masic is a scientist, currently an associate professor at the Massachusetts Institute of Technology. His research involves characterization of complex biomineralized and archaeological structural materials with the objective of inspiring the design of more sustainable and durable building materials.

== Early life ==
Masic was born in Bosnia and Herzegovina, and became a teenage refugee in Croatia during the Bosnian War in 1992. While in Croatia, he enrolled as a nonmatriculating student at a technical high school. He displayed a strong performance in chemistry while in school, and as a result, was eventually approved to receive a high school diploma. With the help of generous sponsors, he continued his higher education at the University of Turin. While in Turin, he co-founded the company, Adamantio srl, which works to preserve ancient cultural heritage. Masic has a doctorate in physical chemistry from the University of Turin, and is currently associate professor at MIT.

== Research interests ==
Masic is the principal investigator for the Laboratory for Multiscale Characterization and Materials Design at MIT. His research is focused on the topics of chemomechanics, the multiscale characterization of biological and antiquity-inspired materials, and the design of new building materials that are more durable and more sustainably produced than today's common construction materials.

In 2023, Masic's research on materials found at Pompeii provided evidence that Roman concrete construction employed a "hot mixing" process using quicklime to produce self-healing properties in the finished concrete and to create a more durable finished product. This contradicts previous assumptions on concrete production which were based on the writings of ada Vitruvius.

== Initiatives ==
While at MIT, Masic has served as the faculty founder for the Refugee ACTion Hub (ReACT), which has three primary goals: "community engagement within MIT and beyond; the development of a certification system for displaced learners; and an outreach effort to connect with broader audiences."
