= Mia Mašić =

Croatian basketball player

Personal information
- Born: 4 April 1993 (age 33) Rijeka, Croatia
- Listed height: 1.80 m (5 ft 11 in)

Career information
- WNBA draft: 2015: undrafted
- Position: Shooting guard

Career history
- Riječanka
- 2011–2013: Pleter
- 2013–2014: Šibenik
- 2014–2015: Muggia
- 2015–2016: Cagliari Virtus

Mia Mašić (born 4 April 1993 in Rijeka, Croatia) is a Croatian female basketball player.
