= Leena Krohn =

Finnish author

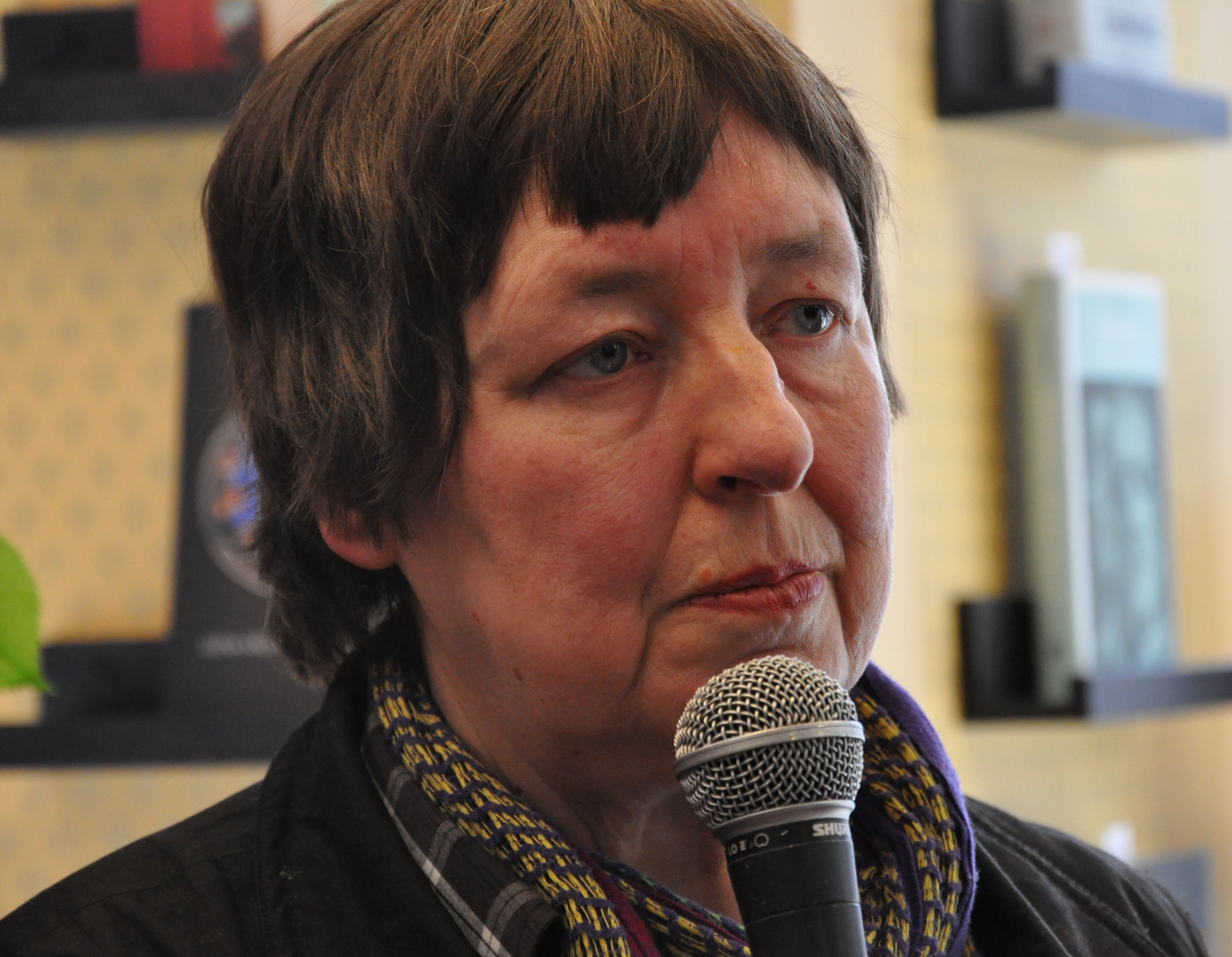
- Born: 28 February 1947 (age 79); Helsinki, Finland
- Occupation: Writer
- Years active: 1970-present

Leena Krohn (born 28 February 1947, in Helsinki) is a Finnish author. Her large and varied body of work includes novels, short stories, children's books, and essays. In her books she deals with topics that include humans' relationships with themselves and the world, morality, borders between reality and illusion, and the problem of life, especially through observing different kinds of artificial intelligence.

Krohn has received several prizes, including the Finlandia Prize for literature in 1992. Her short novel Tainaron: Mail From Another City was nominated for a World Fantasy Award and International Horror Guild Award in 2005. Her books have been translated into English, German, Bulgarian, Estonian, French, Hungarian, Japanese, Korean, Latvian, Lithuanian, Polish, Russian, Norwegian, Danish, Swedish and Italian. Leena Krohn used the Internet in her literary work as early as mid-1990s. Leena Krohn was born and lives in Helsinki.

== Works ==
- Vihreä vallankumous (The Green Revolution, 1970)
- Tyttö joka kasvoi ja muita kertomuksia (The Girl Who Grew Up and other stories, 1973)
- Viimeinen kesävieras. Kertomuksia ihmisten ilmoilta (The Last Summer Guest. Stories about people, 1974)
- Ihmisen vaatteissa. Kertomus kaupungilta (In Human Clothing. A tale of the city, 1976)
- Kertomuksia (Short Stories, 1976)
- Suomalainen Mignon. Runoja ja lauluja vuosilta 1965–1977 (The Finnish Mignon. Poems and Songs 1965–1977, 1977)
- Näkki. Kertomus vesirajasta (Troll. Tales of the water level, 1979)
- Metsänpeitto. Kertomus kadonneista (The Forest Cover. Tales of things lost, 1980)
- Galleria (Gallery, 1982)
- Donna Quijote ja muita kaupunkilaisia. Muotokuva (Doña Quixote and other citizens. Portrait, 1983)
- Sydänpuu (Heart Tree, 1984)
- Tainaron. Postia toisesta kaupungista (Tainaron: Mail from Another City, 1985)
- Oofirin kultaa (Gold of Ophir, 1987)
- Rapina ja muita papereita (Rustling and Other papers, 1989)
- Umbra. Silmäys paradoksien arkistoon (Umbra. A Glimpse of the Archive of Paradoxes, 1990)
- Matemaattisia olioita tai jaettuja unia (Mathematical Beings or Shared Dreams, 1992)
- Todistajan katse (Witness' Gaze, together with Eila Kostamo, 1992)
- Salaisuuksia (Secrets, 1992)
- Tribar (1993)
- Älä lue tätä kirjaa (Do Not Read This Book, 1994)
- Ettei etäisyys ikävöisi (That Distance Shall Not Yearn, 1995)
- Kynä ja kone (The Pen and the Machine, 1996)
- Pereat mundus, Romaani, eräänlainen (Pereat Mundus: A novel of sorts, 1998)
- Sfinksi vai robotti. Filosofinen kuvakirja kaikenikäisille (Sphinx or Robot: A philosophical picture book for people of all ages, 1999)
- Mitä puut tekevät elokuussa (What Trees Do in August, 2000)
- Datura tai harha jonka jokainen näkee (Datura, or a figment seen by everyone, 2001)
- 3 sokeaa miestä ja 1 näkevä (Three blind men and one who can see, 2003)
- Unelmakuolema (A Dream Death, 2004)
- Mehiläispaviljonki (2006)
- Kotini on Riioraa (2008)
- Hotelli Sapiens (Hotel Sapiens, 2013)
- Collected Fiction, (English), Cheeky Frawg Books, 2015
