= Kvindebasketligaen =

- Founded: 1971
- Country: Denmark
- Confederation: FIBA Europe
- Number of teams: 6
- Level on pyramid: 1
- Domestic cup: Danish Cup
- International cup: FIBA Eurocup
- Current champions: AKS Falcon (2nd title)
- Most championships: SISU Copenhague (20 titles)
- Website: dameligaen.dk
- 2024–25

The Kvindebasketligaen is the premier championship for women's basketball clubs in Denmark. It was created in 1971, and it is currently contested by eight teams. It was known as Dameligaen until 2021-2022 season. The champion qualifies for the next season's FIBA Eurocup. SISU Copenhague is the championship's most successful club with 20 titles, followed by Hørsholm 79ers with 9 titles.

== 2017-18 teams ==
- Hørsholm 79'ers
- Lemvig
- SISU
- Stevnsgade Basketball
- Værløse
- Virum Vipers

== List of champions ==
- 1971 SISU
- 1972 SISU
- 1973 Falcon
- 1974 SISU
- 1975 SISU
- 1976 SISU
- 1977 SISU
- 1978 USG
- 1979 USG
- 1980 Virum
- 1981 SISU
- 1982 SISU
- 1983 SISU
- 1984 SISU
- 1985 SISU
- 1986 Horsens
- 1987 SISU
- 1988 SISU
- 1989 Amager
- 1990 SISU
- 1991 Falcon
- 1992 SISU
- 1993 Horsens
- 1994 Amager
- 1995 Amager
- 1996 Hørsholm
- 1997 Åbyhøj
- 1998 SISU
- 1999 Falcon
- 2000 Falcon
- 2001 Åbyhøj
- 2002 Herlev
- 2003 BF Copenhagen
- 2004 Hørsholm
- 2005 Hørsholm
- 2006 Hørsholm
- 2007 Hørsholm
- 2008 Hørsholm
- 2009 Amager
- 2010 Hørsholm
- 2011 SISU
- 2012 SISU
- 2013 SISU
- 2014 SISU
- 2015 Hørsholm
- 2016 Virum GO Dream
- 2017 Virum GO Dream
- 2018 Hørsholm 79ers
- 2019 BK Amager
- 2020 Cancelled due to COVID-19 outbreak
- 2021 BMS Herlev Wolfpack
- 2022 AKS Falcon
- 2023 AKS Falcon
