= Danish Women's Basketball Cup =

- Sport: Basketball
- Founded: 1975
- First season: 1975–76
- Country: Denmark
- Continent: FIBA Europe (Europe)
- Most recent champions: BK Amager (1st title)
- Most titles: SISU (14 titles)
- Related competitions: Dameligaen

The Danish Women's Basketball Cup is the annual basketball cup competition held in Denmark. The first season of the competition was played in 1977. SISU is the all-time record holder with 14 titles.

== Finals ==
Season	Champions	Score	Runners-up	Ref.
2010–11	SISU		Aabyhøj IF	
2011–12	SISU		Hørsholm 79ers	
2012–13	SISU		Lemvig Basket	
2013–14	SISU		Hørsholm 79ers	
2014–15	Stevnsgade Basketball		BK Amager	
2015–16	Stevnsgade Basketball		Lemvig Basket	
2016–17	Lemvig Basket		Virum GO Dream	
2017–18	Hørsholm 79ers	65–55	SISU	
2018–19	Aabyhøj IF	74–59	Stevnsgade Basketball	
2019–20	Hørsholm 79ers	84–63	Værløse BBK	
2020–21	BK Amager	67–53	BMS Herlev Wolfpack	
2021–22	AKS Falcon	90–54	BMS Herlev Wolfpack	
