= SISU BK =

SISU
- Leagues: Basketligaen (Men); Dameligaen (Women)
- Founded: 1954
- Arena: Kildeskovshallen
- Location: Gentofte, Denmark
- Team colors: Red and White
- Website: sisu.dk
Home	Away

SISU Basketball Klub is a Danish basketball club from Gentofte, Copenhagen founded in 1954. It takes its name from the Finnish term Sisu. It is the oldest basketball club in Denmark. Both the men's and women's teams still plays in the league's premier championships. The men's team most recent success was reaching the 2000–01 championship's final rounds, where it lost against Forest Hill, while the women's team has resurfaced as a leading force in recent years, winning two doubles in 2011 and 2012 and playing the FIBA Eurocup.

SISU has also been known as a club with a large and well-functioning youth section with development opportunities for young players in the sport. The Youth Division brings new players to elite teams and the wins youth championships each year. The club has around 400 members, including 300 in the youth section.

== Men's team ==
=== Titles ===
- Danish League (11)
  - 1961, 1962, 1966, 1967, 1972, 1973, 1976, 1981, 1983, 1984, 1985
- Danish Cup (9)
  - 1976, 1977, 1984, 1986, 1988, 1989, 1996, 1997, 1998

=== Notable players ===
Note: Flags indicate national team eligibility at FIBA-sanctioned events. Players may hold other non-FIBA nationalities not displayed.

Criteria

To appear in this section a player must have either:

- Set a club record or won an individual award while at the club
- Played at least one official international match for their national team at any time
- Played at least one official NBA match at any time.

- (Ivory Coast) Adjehi Baru
- (Denmark) Christian Drejer
- (Iceland) Jón Kr. Gíslason
- (Iceland) Lárus Jónsson
- (Morocco) Yunss Akinocho
- (Iceland) Þorsteinn Hallgrímsson

=== Head coaches ===
- Almir Zeco 2011-2015
- Alain Pierre Attallah 2015-2016
- Jim Jabir 2016-2017

== Women's team ==
=== Titles ===
- Danish League (18)
  - 1971, 1972, 1974, 1975, 1976, 1977, 1981, 1982, 1983, 1984, 1985, 1987, 1988, 1990, 1992, 1998, 2011, 2012, 2013, 2014
- Danish Cup (12)
  - 1983, 1985, 1986, 1987, 1988, 1989, 1999, 2004, 2006, 2010, 2011, 2012, 2013, 2014

=== Head coaches ===
- Hrannar Hólm 2010-2014
- Thomas Ginnerup 2014-2015
- Roberto Velosa 2015-2016
- Morten Thomsen 2016-2017
